

539001–539100 

|-bgcolor=#fefefe
| 539001 ||  || — || January 30, 2012 || Mount Lemmon || Mount Lemmon Survey ||  || align=right data-sort-value="0.83" | 830 m || 
|-id=002 bgcolor=#E9E9E9
| 539002 ||  || — || March 9, 2007 || Kitt Peak || Spacewatch ||  || align=right | 1.1 km || 
|-id=003 bgcolor=#E9E9E9
| 539003 ||  || — || January 27, 2015 || Haleakala || Pan-STARRS ||  || align=right | 2.4 km || 
|-id=004 bgcolor=#fefefe
| 539004 ||  || — || March 13, 2012 || Mount Lemmon || Mount Lemmon Survey ||  || align=right data-sort-value="0.65" | 650 m || 
|-id=005 bgcolor=#E9E9E9
| 539005 ||  || — || November 9, 2013 || Haleakala || Pan-STARRS ||  || align=right | 2.5 km || 
|-id=006 bgcolor=#fefefe
| 539006 ||  || — || September 20, 2014 || Haleakala || Pan-STARRS ||  || align=right data-sort-value="0.82" | 820 m || 
|-id=007 bgcolor=#d6d6d6
| 539007 ||  || — || January 23, 2010 || WISE || WISE ||  || align=right | 2.6 km || 
|-id=008 bgcolor=#d6d6d6
| 539008 ||  || — || December 11, 2013 || Haleakala || Pan-STARRS ||  || align=right | 2.5 km || 
|-id=009 bgcolor=#d6d6d6
| 539009 ||  || — || January 27, 2015 || Haleakala || Pan-STARRS ||  || align=right | 2.3 km || 
|-id=010 bgcolor=#E9E9E9
| 539010 ||  || — || May 30, 2016 || Haleakala || Pan-STARRS ||  || align=right | 1.1 km || 
|-id=011 bgcolor=#d6d6d6
| 539011 ||  || — || February 17, 2010 || Kitt Peak || Spacewatch ||  || align=right | 2.1 km || 
|-id=012 bgcolor=#d6d6d6
| 539012 ||  || — || January 29, 2015 || Haleakala || Pan-STARRS ||  || align=right | 3.0 km || 
|-id=013 bgcolor=#E9E9E9
| 539013 ||  || — || December 29, 2014 || Haleakala || Pan-STARRS ||  || align=right | 2.8 km || 
|-id=014 bgcolor=#E9E9E9
| 539014 ||  || — || January 23, 2006 || Mount Lemmon || Mount Lemmon Survey ||  || align=right | 1.6 km || 
|-id=015 bgcolor=#E9E9E9
| 539015 ||  || — || September 16, 2012 || Mount Lemmon || Mount Lemmon Survey ||  || align=right | 2.0 km || 
|-id=016 bgcolor=#fefefe
| 539016 ||  || — || March 2, 2011 || Kitt Peak || Spacewatch ||  || align=right data-sort-value="0.99" | 990 m || 
|-id=017 bgcolor=#d6d6d6
| 539017 ||  || — || January 17, 2007 || Mount Lemmon || Mount Lemmon Survey ||  || align=right | 4.0 km || 
|-id=018 bgcolor=#d6d6d6
| 539018 ||  || — || October 2, 2006 || Mount Lemmon || Mount Lemmon Survey ||  || align=right | 2.6 km || 
|-id=019 bgcolor=#E9E9E9
| 539019 ||  || — || March 29, 2011 || Kitt Peak || Spacewatch ||  || align=right | 1.2 km || 
|-id=020 bgcolor=#d6d6d6
| 539020 ||  || — || June 2, 2016 || Mount Lemmon || Mount Lemmon Survey ||  || align=right | 2.1 km || 
|-id=021 bgcolor=#d6d6d6
| 539021 ||  || — || October 12, 2007 || Mount Lemmon || Mount Lemmon Survey ||  || align=right | 1.9 km || 
|-id=022 bgcolor=#d6d6d6
| 539022 ||  || — || November 5, 2007 || Mount Lemmon || Mount Lemmon Survey ||  || align=right | 2.8 km || 
|-id=023 bgcolor=#E9E9E9
| 539023 ||  || — || July 18, 2012 || Catalina || CSS ||  || align=right | 1.6 km || 
|-id=024 bgcolor=#fefefe
| 539024 ||  || — || January 16, 2015 || Haleakala || Pan-STARRS ||  || align=right data-sort-value="0.70" | 700 m || 
|-id=025 bgcolor=#fefefe
| 539025 ||  || — || April 4, 2008 || Mount Lemmon || Mount Lemmon Survey ||  || align=right data-sort-value="0.94" | 940 m || 
|-id=026 bgcolor=#E9E9E9
| 539026 ||  || — || October 8, 2008 || Mount Lemmon || Mount Lemmon Survey ||  || align=right | 1.4 km || 
|-id=027 bgcolor=#d6d6d6
| 539027 ||  || — || February 10, 2014 || Haleakala || Pan-STARRS ||  || align=right | 2.0 km || 
|-id=028 bgcolor=#E9E9E9
| 539028 ||  || — || November 28, 2013 || Mount Lemmon || Mount Lemmon Survey ||  || align=right | 2.8 km || 
|-id=029 bgcolor=#fefefe
| 539029 ||  || — || January 30, 2011 || Haleakala || Pan-STARRS ||  || align=right data-sort-value="0.82" | 820 m || 
|-id=030 bgcolor=#E9E9E9
| 539030 ||  || — || October 8, 2008 || Mount Lemmon || Mount Lemmon Survey ||  || align=right data-sort-value="0.94" | 940 m || 
|-id=031 bgcolor=#E9E9E9
| 539031 ||  || — || November 11, 2013 || Kitt Peak || Spacewatch ||  || align=right | 1.1 km || 
|-id=032 bgcolor=#d6d6d6
| 539032 ||  || — || December 23, 2001 || Kitt Peak || Spacewatch ||  || align=right | 2.8 km || 
|-id=033 bgcolor=#E9E9E9
| 539033 ||  || — || September 28, 2003 || Kitt Peak || Spacewatch ||  || align=right | 2.6 km || 
|-id=034 bgcolor=#E9E9E9
| 539034 ||  || — || September 20, 2003 || Kitt Peak || Spacewatch ||  || align=right | 2.1 km || 
|-id=035 bgcolor=#E9E9E9
| 539035 ||  || — || May 1, 2003 || Kitt Peak || Spacewatch ||  || align=right | 1.0 km || 
|-id=036 bgcolor=#fefefe
| 539036 ||  || — || January 17, 2007 || Kitt Peak || Spacewatch ||  || align=right | 1.1 km || 
|-id=037 bgcolor=#fefefe
| 539037 ||  || — || March 29, 2008 || Kitt Peak || Spacewatch ||  || align=right data-sort-value="0.79" | 790 m || 
|-id=038 bgcolor=#E9E9E9
| 539038 ||  || — || June 2, 2016 || Haleakala || Pan-STARRS ||  || align=right | 1.0 km || 
|-id=039 bgcolor=#d6d6d6
| 539039 ||  || — || February 25, 2015 || Haleakala || Pan-STARRS ||  || align=right | 2.9 km || 
|-id=040 bgcolor=#E9E9E9
| 539040 ||  || — || October 27, 2013 || Kitt Peak || Spacewatch ||  || align=right data-sort-value="0.88" | 880 m || 
|-id=041 bgcolor=#E9E9E9
| 539041 ||  || — || December 12, 2014 || Haleakala || Pan-STARRS ||  || align=right data-sort-value="0.92" | 920 m || 
|-id=042 bgcolor=#E9E9E9
| 539042 ||  || — || May 22, 2011 || Mount Lemmon || Mount Lemmon Survey ||  || align=right | 1.3 km || 
|-id=043 bgcolor=#E9E9E9
| 539043 ||  || — || May 30, 2011 || Haleakala || Pan-STARRS ||  || align=right | 1.7 km || 
|-id=044 bgcolor=#fefefe
| 539044 ||  || — || January 16, 2015 || Haleakala || Pan-STARRS ||  || align=right data-sort-value="0.92" | 920 m || 
|-id=045 bgcolor=#E9E9E9
| 539045 ||  || — || August 24, 2007 || Kitt Peak || Spacewatch ||  || align=right | 1.9 km || 
|-id=046 bgcolor=#E9E9E9
| 539046 ||  || — || January 26, 2015 || Haleakala || Pan-STARRS ||  || align=right | 1.6 km || 
|-id=047 bgcolor=#E9E9E9
| 539047 ||  || — || September 25, 2012 || Mount Lemmon || Mount Lemmon Survey ||  || align=right | 1.2 km || 
|-id=048 bgcolor=#E9E9E9
| 539048 ||  || — || December 3, 2013 || Mount Lemmon || Mount Lemmon Survey ||  || align=right data-sort-value="0.91" | 910 m || 
|-id=049 bgcolor=#E9E9E9
| 539049 ||  || — || January 8, 2011 || Mount Lemmon || Mount Lemmon Survey ||  || align=right data-sort-value="0.96" | 960 m || 
|-id=050 bgcolor=#E9E9E9
| 539050 ||  || — || January 7, 2014 || Mount Lemmon || Mount Lemmon Survey ||  || align=right | 2.2 km || 
|-id=051 bgcolor=#fefefe
| 539051 ||  || — || January 20, 2008 || Kitt Peak || Spacewatch ||  || align=right data-sort-value="0.90" | 900 m || 
|-id=052 bgcolor=#fefefe
| 539052 ||  || — || September 18, 2003 || Kitt Peak || Spacewatch ||  || align=right data-sort-value="0.68" | 680 m || 
|-id=053 bgcolor=#fefefe
| 539053 ||  || — || September 26, 2006 || Mount Lemmon || Mount Lemmon Survey ||  || align=right data-sort-value="0.88" | 880 m || 
|-id=054 bgcolor=#E9E9E9
| 539054 ||  || — || April 11, 2007 || Kitt Peak || Spacewatch ||  || align=right | 2.0 km || 
|-id=055 bgcolor=#fefefe
| 539055 ||  || — || December 18, 2007 || Kitt Peak || Spacewatch ||  || align=right data-sort-value="0.90" | 900 m || 
|-id=056 bgcolor=#fefefe
| 539056 ||  || — || January 18, 2009 || Kitt Peak || Spacewatch ||  || align=right data-sort-value="0.56" | 560 m || 
|-id=057 bgcolor=#E9E9E9
| 539057 ||  || — || December 18, 2009 || Mount Lemmon || Mount Lemmon Survey ||  || align=right | 2.4 km || 
|-id=058 bgcolor=#fefefe
| 539058 ||  || — || October 9, 2007 || Kitt Peak || Spacewatch ||  || align=right data-sort-value="0.69" | 690 m || 
|-id=059 bgcolor=#E9E9E9
| 539059 ||  || — || March 11, 2011 || Kitt Peak || Spacewatch ||  || align=right | 1.6 km || 
|-id=060 bgcolor=#E9E9E9
| 539060 ||  || — || October 14, 2004 || Kitt Peak || Spacewatch ||  || align=right | 1.9 km || 
|-id=061 bgcolor=#fefefe
| 539061 ||  || — || September 13, 2007 || Kitt Peak || Spacewatch ||  || align=right data-sort-value="0.62" | 620 m || 
|-id=062 bgcolor=#FA8072
| 539062 ||  || — || May 16, 2012 || Mount Lemmon || Mount Lemmon Survey ||  || align=right data-sort-value="0.69" | 690 m || 
|-id=063 bgcolor=#FFC2E0
| 539063 ||  || — || June 29, 2016 || Haleakala || Pan-STARRS || APOPHA || align=right data-sort-value="0.54" | 540 m || 
|-id=064 bgcolor=#fefefe
| 539064 ||  || — || January 29, 2012 || Kitt Peak || Spacewatch ||  || align=right data-sort-value="0.80" | 800 m || 
|-id=065 bgcolor=#E9E9E9
| 539065 ||  || — || January 15, 2015 || Haleakala || Pan-STARRS ||  || align=right | 1.2 km || 
|-id=066 bgcolor=#fefefe
| 539066 ||  || — || October 15, 2004 || Kitt Peak || Spacewatch ||  || align=right data-sort-value="0.81" | 810 m || 
|-id=067 bgcolor=#E9E9E9
| 539067 ||  || — || October 10, 2012 || Mount Lemmon || Mount Lemmon Survey ||  || align=right | 1.7 km || 
|-id=068 bgcolor=#E9E9E9
| 539068 ||  || — || October 18, 2012 || Mount Lemmon || Mount Lemmon Survey ||  || align=right | 1.7 km || 
|-id=069 bgcolor=#d6d6d6
| 539069 ||  || — || February 26, 2014 || Haleakala || Pan-STARRS ||  || align=right | 3.0 km || 
|-id=070 bgcolor=#d6d6d6
| 539070 ||  || — || February 26, 2014 || Mount Lemmon || Mount Lemmon Survey ||  || align=right | 2.3 km || 
|-id=071 bgcolor=#fefefe
| 539071 ||  || — || January 20, 2015 || Haleakala || Pan-STARRS ||  || align=right data-sort-value="0.61" | 610 m || 
|-id=072 bgcolor=#fefefe
| 539072 ||  || — || January 30, 2004 || Kitt Peak || Spacewatch ||  || align=right data-sort-value="0.75" | 750 m || 
|-id=073 bgcolor=#fefefe
| 539073 ||  || — || December 31, 2005 || Kitt Peak || Spacewatch ||  || align=right | 1.2 km || 
|-id=074 bgcolor=#fefefe
| 539074 ||  || — || October 1, 2005 || Mount Lemmon || Mount Lemmon Survey ||  || align=right data-sort-value="0.76" | 760 m || 
|-id=075 bgcolor=#fefefe
| 539075 ||  || — || September 15, 2009 || Kitt Peak || Spacewatch ||  || align=right | 1.1 km || 
|-id=076 bgcolor=#E9E9E9
| 539076 ||  || — || January 2, 2009 || Kitt Peak || Spacewatch ||  || align=right | 3.0 km || 
|-id=077 bgcolor=#E9E9E9
| 539077 ||  || — || November 19, 2008 || Catalina || CSS ||  || align=right data-sort-value="0.99" | 990 m || 
|-id=078 bgcolor=#E9E9E9
| 539078 ||  || — || January 3, 2014 || Kitt Peak || Spacewatch ||  || align=right | 2.0 km || 
|-id=079 bgcolor=#fefefe
| 539079 ||  || — || December 25, 2005 || Kitt Peak || Spacewatch ||  || align=right data-sort-value="0.76" | 760 m || 
|-id=080 bgcolor=#E9E9E9
| 539080 ||  || — || April 20, 2010 || WISE || WISE ||  || align=right | 2.8 km || 
|-id=081 bgcolor=#fefefe
| 539081 ||  || — || April 22, 2009 || Mount Lemmon || Mount Lemmon Survey ||  || align=right data-sort-value="0.68" | 680 m || 
|-id=082 bgcolor=#d6d6d6
| 539082 ||  || — || January 7, 2013 || Mount Lemmon || Mount Lemmon Survey || Tj (2.9) || align=right | 4.0 km || 
|-id=083 bgcolor=#fefefe
| 539083 ||  || — || November 20, 2006 || Kitt Peak || Spacewatch ||  || align=right data-sort-value="0.72" | 720 m || 
|-id=084 bgcolor=#fefefe
| 539084 ||  || — || November 2, 2013 || Mount Lemmon || Mount Lemmon Survey ||  || align=right | 1.1 km || 
|-id=085 bgcolor=#FA8072
| 539085 ||  || — || June 27, 2009 || La Sagra || OAM Obs. ||  || align=right data-sort-value="0.71" | 710 m || 
|-id=086 bgcolor=#fefefe
| 539086 ||  || — || January 21, 2015 || Haleakala || Pan-STARRS ||  || align=right data-sort-value="0.78" | 780 m || 
|-id=087 bgcolor=#E9E9E9
| 539087 ||  || — || December 25, 2013 || Kitt Peak || Spacewatch ||  || align=right | 1.2 km || 
|-id=088 bgcolor=#fefefe
| 539088 ||  || — || January 20, 2015 || Haleakala || Pan-STARRS ||  || align=right data-sort-value="0.89" | 890 m || 
|-id=089 bgcolor=#d6d6d6
| 539089 ||  || — || November 27, 2006 || Kitt Peak || Spacewatch ||  || align=right | 3.0 km || 
|-id=090 bgcolor=#FA8072
| 539090 ||  || — || September 26, 2006 || Catalina || CSS ||  || align=right data-sort-value="0.70" | 700 m || 
|-id=091 bgcolor=#fefefe
| 539091 ||  || — || May 1, 2009 || Mount Lemmon || Mount Lemmon Survey ||  || align=right data-sort-value="0.56" | 560 m || 
|-id=092 bgcolor=#E9E9E9
| 539092 ||  || — || January 16, 2015 || Haleakala || Pan-STARRS ||  || align=right data-sort-value="0.91" | 910 m || 
|-id=093 bgcolor=#d6d6d6
| 539093 ||  || — || February 23, 2015 || Haleakala || Pan-STARRS ||  || align=right | 2.5 km || 
|-id=094 bgcolor=#fefefe
| 539094 ||  || — || March 30, 2008 || Kitt Peak || Spacewatch ||  || align=right data-sort-value="0.71" | 710 m || 
|-id=095 bgcolor=#d6d6d6
| 539095 ||  || — || October 21, 2006 || Kitt Peak || Spacewatch ||  || align=right | 2.4 km || 
|-id=096 bgcolor=#fefefe
| 539096 ||  || — || January 16, 2015 || Haleakala || Pan-STARRS ||  || align=right | 1.1 km || 
|-id=097 bgcolor=#fefefe
| 539097 ||  || — || July 29, 2009 || Kitt Peak || Spacewatch ||  || align=right data-sort-value="0.79" | 790 m || 
|-id=098 bgcolor=#d6d6d6
| 539098 ||  || — || August 17, 1999 || Kitt Peak || Spacewatch ||  || align=right | 3.4 km || 
|-id=099 bgcolor=#d6d6d6
| 539099 ||  || — || March 16, 2010 || WISE || WISE ||  || align=right | 2.9 km || 
|-id=100 bgcolor=#fefefe
| 539100 ||  || — || November 20, 2003 || Kitt Peak || Spacewatch ||  || align=right | 1.1 km || 
|}

539101–539200 

|-bgcolor=#fefefe
| 539101 ||  || — || July 13, 2016 || Mount Lemmon || Mount Lemmon Survey ||  || align=right data-sort-value="0.71" | 710 m || 
|-id=102 bgcolor=#E9E9E9
| 539102 ||  || — || September 26, 2012 || Mount Lemmon || Mount Lemmon Survey ||  || align=right data-sort-value="0.89" | 890 m || 
|-id=103 bgcolor=#fefefe
| 539103 ||  || — || July 18, 2012 || Catalina || CSS ||  || align=right data-sort-value="0.78" | 780 m || 
|-id=104 bgcolor=#fefefe
| 539104 ||  || — || April 6, 2008 || Kitt Peak || Spacewatch ||  || align=right data-sort-value="0.75" | 750 m || 
|-id=105 bgcolor=#E9E9E9
| 539105 ||  || — || December 4, 2013 || Haleakala || Pan-STARRS ||  || align=right | 1.9 km || 
|-id=106 bgcolor=#d6d6d6
| 539106 ||  || — || July 11, 2016 || Haleakala || Pan-STARRS ||  || align=right | 2.1 km || 
|-id=107 bgcolor=#d6d6d6
| 539107 ||  || — || May 16, 2010 || WISE || WISE ||  || align=right | 3.6 km || 
|-id=108 bgcolor=#d6d6d6
| 539108 ||  || — || March 4, 2005 || Mount Lemmon || Mount Lemmon Survey ||  || align=right | 2.5 km || 
|-id=109 bgcolor=#E9E9E9
| 539109 ||  || — || March 16, 2005 || Mount Lemmon || Mount Lemmon Survey ||  || align=right | 1.8 km || 
|-id=110 bgcolor=#d6d6d6
| 539110 ||  || — || June 8, 2016 || Mount Lemmon || Mount Lemmon Survey ||  || align=right | 2.9 km || 
|-id=111 bgcolor=#E9E9E9
| 539111 ||  || — || March 22, 2015 || Haleakala || Pan-STARRS ||  || align=right data-sort-value="0.70" | 700 m || 
|-id=112 bgcolor=#E9E9E9
| 539112 ||  || — || March 20, 2002 || Kitt Peak || Spacewatch ||  || align=right | 1.1 km || 
|-id=113 bgcolor=#E9E9E9
| 539113 ||  || — || May 6, 2006 || Mount Lemmon || Mount Lemmon Survey ||  || align=right | 2.1 km || 
|-id=114 bgcolor=#d6d6d6
| 539114 ||  || — || July 4, 2016 || Haleakala || Pan-STARRS ||  || align=right | 2.5 km || 
|-id=115 bgcolor=#d6d6d6
| 539115 ||  || — || September 18, 2011 || Mount Lemmon || Mount Lemmon Survey ||  || align=right | 2.0 km || 
|-id=116 bgcolor=#E9E9E9
| 539116 ||  || — || July 18, 2012 || Siding Spring || SSS ||  || align=right | 1.0 km || 
|-id=117 bgcolor=#d6d6d6
| 539117 ||  || — || April 18, 2015 || Haleakala || Pan-STARRS ||  || align=right | 2.9 km || 
|-id=118 bgcolor=#d6d6d6
| 539118 ||  || — || November 17, 2006 || Mount Lemmon || Mount Lemmon Survey ||  || align=right | 3.3 km || 
|-id=119 bgcolor=#d6d6d6
| 539119 ||  || — || April 23, 2015 || Haleakala || Pan-STARRS ||  || align=right | 2.5 km || 
|-id=120 bgcolor=#d6d6d6
| 539120 ||  || — || October 20, 2006 || Mount Lemmon || Mount Lemmon Survey ||  || align=right | 2.8 km || 
|-id=121 bgcolor=#d6d6d6
| 539121 ||  || — || February 20, 2014 || Mount Lemmon || Mount Lemmon Survey ||  || align=right | 2.3 km || 
|-id=122 bgcolor=#d6d6d6
| 539122 ||  || — || February 28, 2014 || Mount Lemmon || Mount Lemmon Survey ||  || align=right | 3.3 km || 
|-id=123 bgcolor=#d6d6d6
| 539123 ||  || — || July 11, 2016 || Haleakala || Pan-STARRS ||  || align=right | 2.4 km || 
|-id=124 bgcolor=#d6d6d6
| 539124 ||  || — || September 23, 2011 || Kitt Peak || Spacewatch ||  || align=right | 2.5 km || 
|-id=125 bgcolor=#d6d6d6
| 539125 ||  || — || December 18, 2007 || Mount Lemmon || Mount Lemmon Survey ||  || align=right | 2.8 km || 
|-id=126 bgcolor=#d6d6d6
| 539126 ||  || — || December 13, 2006 || Mount Lemmon || Mount Lemmon Survey ||  || align=right | 2.5 km || 
|-id=127 bgcolor=#fefefe
| 539127 ||  || — || March 24, 2015 || Mount Lemmon || Mount Lemmon Survey ||  || align=right data-sort-value="0.82" | 820 m || 
|-id=128 bgcolor=#d6d6d6
| 539128 ||  || — || April 24, 2015 || Haleakala || Pan-STARRS ||  || align=right | 2.5 km || 
|-id=129 bgcolor=#d6d6d6
| 539129 ||  || — || February 20, 2009 || Kitt Peak || Spacewatch ||  || align=right | 2.3 km || 
|-id=130 bgcolor=#E9E9E9
| 539130 ||  || — || March 16, 2007 || Catalina || CSS ||  || align=right | 1.4 km || 
|-id=131 bgcolor=#d6d6d6
| 539131 ||  || — || August 27, 2011 || Haleakala || Pan-STARRS ||  || align=right | 2.3 km || 
|-id=132 bgcolor=#fefefe
| 539132 ||  || — || January 29, 2011 || Kitt Peak || Spacewatch ||  || align=right data-sort-value="0.87" | 870 m || 
|-id=133 bgcolor=#E9E9E9
| 539133 ||  || — || October 26, 2008 || Mount Lemmon || Mount Lemmon Survey ||  || align=right | 2.1 km || 
|-id=134 bgcolor=#E9E9E9
| 539134 ||  || — || May 10, 2007 || Mount Lemmon || Mount Lemmon Survey ||  || align=right | 1.3 km || 
|-id=135 bgcolor=#d6d6d6
| 539135 ||  || — || September 13, 2007 || Mount Lemmon || Mount Lemmon Survey ||  || align=right | 1.7 km || 
|-id=136 bgcolor=#d6d6d6
| 539136 ||  || — || October 17, 2012 || Mount Lemmon || Mount Lemmon Survey ||  || align=right | 1.9 km || 
|-id=137 bgcolor=#d6d6d6
| 539137 ||  || — || November 7, 2007 || Mount Lemmon || Mount Lemmon Survey ||  || align=right | 4.4 km || 
|-id=138 bgcolor=#d6d6d6
| 539138 ||  || — || July 27, 2011 || Haleakala || Pan-STARRS ||  || align=right | 2.4 km || 
|-id=139 bgcolor=#d6d6d6
| 539139 ||  || — || November 11, 2007 || Mount Lemmon || Mount Lemmon Survey ||  || align=right | 2.6 km || 
|-id=140 bgcolor=#E9E9E9
| 539140 ||  || — || July 7, 2016 || Haleakala || Pan-STARRS ||  || align=right | 1.8 km || 
|-id=141 bgcolor=#E9E9E9
| 539141 ||  || — || May 26, 2007 || Mount Lemmon || Mount Lemmon Survey ||  || align=right | 1.1 km || 
|-id=142 bgcolor=#E9E9E9
| 539142 ||  || — || May 26, 2015 || Haleakala || Pan-STARRS ||  || align=right | 2.1 km || 
|-id=143 bgcolor=#E9E9E9
| 539143 ||  || — || December 5, 2008 || Mount Lemmon || Mount Lemmon Survey ||  || align=right | 1.8 km || 
|-id=144 bgcolor=#d6d6d6
| 539144 ||  || — || January 23, 2014 || Mount Lemmon || Mount Lemmon Survey ||  || align=right | 2.0 km || 
|-id=145 bgcolor=#d6d6d6
| 539145 ||  || — || October 22, 2012 || Mount Lemmon || Mount Lemmon Survey ||  || align=right | 2.0 km || 
|-id=146 bgcolor=#E9E9E9
| 539146 ||  || — || September 13, 2007 || Catalina || CSS ||  || align=right | 1.8 km || 
|-id=147 bgcolor=#d6d6d6
| 539147 ||  || — || December 18, 2007 || Mount Lemmon || Mount Lemmon Survey ||  || align=right | 2.6 km || 
|-id=148 bgcolor=#d6d6d6
| 539148 ||  || — || February 9, 2008 || Mount Lemmon || Mount Lemmon Survey ||  || align=right | 2.8 km || 
|-id=149 bgcolor=#d6d6d6
| 539149 ||  || — || February 24, 2014 || Haleakala || Pan-STARRS ||  || align=right | 2.6 km || 
|-id=150 bgcolor=#d6d6d6
| 539150 ||  || — || February 26, 2014 || Haleakala || Pan-STARRS ||  || align=right | 2.4 km || 
|-id=151 bgcolor=#d6d6d6
| 539151 ||  || — || September 18, 2011 || Mount Lemmon || Mount Lemmon Survey ||  || align=right | 2.1 km || 
|-id=152 bgcolor=#E9E9E9
| 539152 ||  || — || May 23, 1998 || Kitt Peak || Spacewatch ||  || align=right | 1.6 km || 
|-id=153 bgcolor=#fefefe
| 539153 ||  || — || January 20, 2015 || Haleakala || Pan-STARRS ||  || align=right data-sort-value="0.71" | 710 m || 
|-id=154 bgcolor=#d6d6d6
| 539154 ||  || — || September 19, 2011 || Haleakala || Pan-STARRS ||  || align=right | 2.8 km || 
|-id=155 bgcolor=#d6d6d6
| 539155 ||  || — || February 12, 2008 || Mount Lemmon || Mount Lemmon Survey ||  || align=right | 2.8 km || 
|-id=156 bgcolor=#E9E9E9
| 539156 ||  || — || February 17, 2010 || Kitt Peak || Spacewatch ||  || align=right | 1.7 km || 
|-id=157 bgcolor=#fefefe
| 539157 ||  || — || November 2, 2013 || Mount Lemmon || Mount Lemmon Survey ||  || align=right data-sort-value="0.89" | 890 m || 
|-id=158 bgcolor=#d6d6d6
| 539158 ||  || — || January 19, 2013 || Kitt Peak || Spacewatch ||  || align=right | 2.9 km || 
|-id=159 bgcolor=#d6d6d6
| 539159 ||  || — || September 30, 2011 || Kitt Peak || Spacewatch ||  || align=right | 2.7 km || 
|-id=160 bgcolor=#d6d6d6
| 539160 ||  || — || February 7, 2008 || Mount Lemmon || Mount Lemmon Survey ||  || align=right | 2.7 km || 
|-id=161 bgcolor=#d6d6d6
| 539161 ||  || — || July 11, 2016 || Haleakala || Pan-STARRS ||  || align=right | 3.3 km || 
|-id=162 bgcolor=#d6d6d6
| 539162 ||  || — || February 26, 2014 || Haleakala || Pan-STARRS ||  || align=right | 2.3 km || 
|-id=163 bgcolor=#E9E9E9
| 539163 ||  || — || January 23, 2015 || Haleakala || Pan-STARRS ||  || align=right data-sort-value="0.84" | 840 m || 
|-id=164 bgcolor=#E9E9E9
| 539164 ||  || — || June 6, 2010 || WISE || WISE ||  || align=right | 1.6 km || 
|-id=165 bgcolor=#E9E9E9
| 539165 ||  || — || January 12, 2010 || Mount Lemmon || Mount Lemmon Survey ||  || align=right | 1.4 km || 
|-id=166 bgcolor=#d6d6d6
| 539166 ||  || — || January 9, 2014 || Kitt Peak || Spacewatch ||  || align=right | 2.2 km || 
|-id=167 bgcolor=#d6d6d6
| 539167 ||  || — || February 10, 2014 || Haleakala || Pan-STARRS ||  || align=right | 2.5 km || 
|-id=168 bgcolor=#d6d6d6
| 539168 ||  || — || August 28, 2011 || Siding Spring || SSS ||  || align=right | 2.9 km || 
|-id=169 bgcolor=#d6d6d6
| 539169 ||  || — || August 1, 2011 || Haleakala || Pan-STARRS ||  || align=right | 2.5 km || 
|-id=170 bgcolor=#fefefe
| 539170 ||  || — || January 16, 2015 || Haleakala || Pan-STARRS ||  || align=right data-sort-value="0.80" | 800 m || 
|-id=171 bgcolor=#d6d6d6
| 539171 ||  || — || January 29, 2014 || Kitt Peak || Spacewatch ||  || align=right | 2.4 km || 
|-id=172 bgcolor=#d6d6d6
| 539172 ||  || — || January 28, 2014 || Kitt Peak || Spacewatch ||  || align=right | 2.7 km || 
|-id=173 bgcolor=#d6d6d6
| 539173 ||  || — || February 27, 2014 || Haleakala || Pan-STARRS ||  || align=right | 2.3 km || 
|-id=174 bgcolor=#d6d6d6
| 539174 ||  || — || October 18, 2012 || Haleakala || Pan-STARRS ||  || align=right | 1.7 km || 
|-id=175 bgcolor=#E9E9E9
| 539175 ||  || — || September 23, 2012 || Kitt Peak || Spacewatch ||  || align=right | 1.8 km || 
|-id=176 bgcolor=#E9E9E9
| 539176 ||  || — || November 19, 2008 || Kitt Peak || Spacewatch ||  || align=right | 2.5 km || 
|-id=177 bgcolor=#E9E9E9
| 539177 ||  || — || November 20, 2003 || Kitt Peak || Spacewatch ||  || align=right | 2.4 km || 
|-id=178 bgcolor=#E9E9E9
| 539178 ||  || — || October 8, 2012 || Haleakala || Pan-STARRS ||  || align=right | 1.8 km || 
|-id=179 bgcolor=#E9E9E9
| 539179 ||  || — || September 16, 2012 || Kitt Peak || Spacewatch ||  || align=right | 1.5 km || 
|-id=180 bgcolor=#d6d6d6
| 539180 ||  || — || September 25, 2011 || Haleakala || Pan-STARRS ||  || align=right | 3.3 km || 
|-id=181 bgcolor=#d6d6d6
| 539181 ||  || — || February 12, 2008 || Mount Lemmon || Mount Lemmon Survey ||  || align=right | 3.0 km || 
|-id=182 bgcolor=#E9E9E9
| 539182 ||  || — || October 20, 2012 || Kitt Peak || Spacewatch ||  || align=right | 1.9 km || 
|-id=183 bgcolor=#E9E9E9
| 539183 ||  || — || November 30, 2008 || Mount Lemmon || Mount Lemmon Survey ||  || align=right | 1.7 km || 
|-id=184 bgcolor=#d6d6d6
| 539184 ||  || — || September 4, 2011 || Haleakala || Pan-STARRS ||  || align=right | 2.9 km || 
|-id=185 bgcolor=#E9E9E9
| 539185 ||  || — || September 19, 2003 || Kitt Peak || Spacewatch ||  || align=right | 1.2 km || 
|-id=186 bgcolor=#E9E9E9
| 539186 ||  || — || September 15, 2012 || Catalina || CSS ||  || align=right | 1.1 km || 
|-id=187 bgcolor=#E9E9E9
| 539187 ||  || — || November 13, 2012 || Mount Lemmon || Mount Lemmon Survey ||  || align=right | 1.9 km || 
|-id=188 bgcolor=#E9E9E9
| 539188 ||  || — || October 7, 2012 || Haleakala || Pan-STARRS ||  || align=right | 1.8 km || 
|-id=189 bgcolor=#E9E9E9
| 539189 ||  || — || February 24, 2015 || Haleakala || Pan-STARRS ||  || align=right | 2.4 km || 
|-id=190 bgcolor=#E9E9E9
| 539190 ||  || — || October 20, 2012 || Kitt Peak || Spacewatch ||  || align=right | 2.8 km || 
|-id=191 bgcolor=#d6d6d6
| 539191 ||  || — || January 11, 2003 || Kitt Peak || Spacewatch ||  || align=right | 2.6 km || 
|-id=192 bgcolor=#E9E9E9
| 539192 ||  || — || January 27, 2015 || Haleakala || Pan-STARRS ||  || align=right data-sort-value="0.91" | 910 m || 
|-id=193 bgcolor=#d6d6d6
| 539193 ||  || — || January 7, 2009 || Kitt Peak || Spacewatch ||  || align=right | 1.8 km || 
|-id=194 bgcolor=#fefefe
| 539194 ||  || — || January 17, 2015 || Haleakala || Pan-STARRS ||  || align=right data-sort-value="0.82" | 820 m || 
|-id=195 bgcolor=#E9E9E9
| 539195 ||  || — || February 24, 2015 || Haleakala || Pan-STARRS ||  || align=right data-sort-value="0.75" | 750 m || 
|-id=196 bgcolor=#d6d6d6
| 539196 ||  || — || July 5, 2016 || Haleakala || Pan-STARRS ||  || align=right | 2.1 km || 
|-id=197 bgcolor=#E9E9E9
| 539197 ||  || — || March 15, 2010 || WISE || WISE ||  || align=right data-sort-value="0.89" | 890 m || 
|-id=198 bgcolor=#d6d6d6
| 539198 ||  || — || January 25, 2009 || Kitt Peak || Spacewatch ||  || align=right | 2.3 km || 
|-id=199 bgcolor=#d6d6d6
| 539199 ||  || — || January 1, 2014 || Kitt Peak || Spacewatch ||  || align=right | 2.0 km || 
|-id=200 bgcolor=#d6d6d6
| 539200 ||  || — || February 28, 2014 || Mount Lemmon || Mount Lemmon Survey ||  || align=right | 2.3 km || 
|}

539201–539300 

|-bgcolor=#E9E9E9
| 539201 ||  || — || January 22, 2015 || Haleakala || Pan-STARRS ||  || align=right | 1.2 km || 
|-id=202 bgcolor=#d6d6d6
| 539202 ||  || — || July 7, 2016 || Mount Lemmon || Mount Lemmon Survey ||  || align=right | 2.9 km || 
|-id=203 bgcolor=#d6d6d6
| 539203 ||  || — || April 23, 2015 || Haleakala || Pan-STARRS ||  || align=right | 1.9 km || 
|-id=204 bgcolor=#fefefe
| 539204 ||  || — || January 17, 2015 || Haleakala || Pan-STARRS ||  || align=right data-sort-value="0.59" | 590 m || 
|-id=205 bgcolor=#d6d6d6
| 539205 ||  || — || March 27, 2010 || WISE || WISE ||  || align=right | 3.6 km || 
|-id=206 bgcolor=#d6d6d6
| 539206 ||  || — || July 9, 2016 || Mount Lemmon || Mount Lemmon Survey ||  || align=right | 3.1 km || 
|-id=207 bgcolor=#E9E9E9
| 539207 ||  || — || January 2, 2014 || Mount Lemmon || Mount Lemmon Survey ||  || align=right | 1.1 km || 
|-id=208 bgcolor=#E9E9E9
| 539208 ||  || — || April 30, 2011 || Mount Lemmon || Mount Lemmon Survey ||  || align=right | 1.5 km || 
|-id=209 bgcolor=#d6d6d6
| 539209 ||  || — || July 11, 2016 || Haleakala || Pan-STARRS ||  || align=right | 2.8 km || 
|-id=210 bgcolor=#d6d6d6
| 539210 ||  || — || September 23, 2011 || Kitt Peak || Spacewatch ||  || align=right | 2.7 km || 
|-id=211 bgcolor=#fefefe
| 539211 ||  || — || February 24, 2015 || Haleakala || Pan-STARRS ||  || align=right data-sort-value="0.62" | 620 m || 
|-id=212 bgcolor=#d6d6d6
| 539212 ||  || — || December 6, 2012 || Mount Lemmon || Mount Lemmon Survey ||  || align=right | 2.3 km || 
|-id=213 bgcolor=#E9E9E9
| 539213 ||  || — || October 25, 2012 || Mount Lemmon || Mount Lemmon Survey ||  || align=right | 1.1 km || 
|-id=214 bgcolor=#E9E9E9
| 539214 ||  || — || March 25, 2015 || Mount Lemmon || Mount Lemmon Survey ||  || align=right | 1.8 km || 
|-id=215 bgcolor=#fefefe
| 539215 ||  || — || March 25, 2015 || Haleakala || Pan-STARRS ||  || align=right data-sort-value="0.86" | 860 m || 
|-id=216 bgcolor=#E9E9E9
| 539216 ||  || — || July 11, 2016 || Haleakala || Pan-STARRS ||  || align=right data-sort-value="0.73" | 730 m || 
|-id=217 bgcolor=#E9E9E9
| 539217 ||  || — || March 20, 2010 || Kitt Peak || Spacewatch ||  || align=right | 1.8 km || 
|-id=218 bgcolor=#E9E9E9
| 539218 ||  || — || April 26, 2011 || Kitt Peak || Spacewatch ||  || align=right | 1.2 km || 
|-id=219 bgcolor=#d6d6d6
| 539219 ||  || — || June 9, 2011 || Kitt Peak || Spacewatch ||  || align=right | 3.5 km || 
|-id=220 bgcolor=#E9E9E9
| 539220 ||  || — || August 2, 2011 || Haleakala || Pan-STARRS ||  || align=right | 2.4 km || 
|-id=221 bgcolor=#d6d6d6
| 539221 ||  || — || December 30, 2013 || Kitt Peak || Spacewatch ||  || align=right | 2.6 km || 
|-id=222 bgcolor=#d6d6d6
| 539222 ||  || — || August 29, 2005 || Kitt Peak || Spacewatch ||  || align=right | 2.3 km || 
|-id=223 bgcolor=#E9E9E9
| 539223 ||  || — || February 1, 2006 || Kitt Peak || Spacewatch ||  || align=right | 1.0 km || 
|-id=224 bgcolor=#d6d6d6
| 539224 ||  || — || July 5, 2016 || Haleakala || Pan-STARRS ||  || align=right | 2.7 km || 
|-id=225 bgcolor=#d6d6d6
| 539225 ||  || — || July 9, 2016 || Haleakala || Pan-STARRS ||  || align=right | 2.1 km || 
|-id=226 bgcolor=#d6d6d6
| 539226 ||  || — || July 4, 2016 || Haleakala || Pan-STARRS ||  || align=right | 2.1 km || 
|-id=227 bgcolor=#d6d6d6
| 539227 ||  || — || July 7, 2016 || Haleakala || Pan-STARRS ||  || align=right | 2.5 km || 
|-id=228 bgcolor=#d6d6d6
| 539228 ||  || — || January 13, 2002 || Socorro || LINEAR ||  || align=right | 3.3 km || 
|-id=229 bgcolor=#d6d6d6
| 539229 ||  || — || April 23, 2015 || Haleakala || Pan-STARRS ||  || align=right | 2.2 km || 
|-id=230 bgcolor=#E9E9E9
| 539230 ||  || — || February 26, 2014 || Mount Lemmon || Mount Lemmon Survey ||  || align=right | 1.9 km || 
|-id=231 bgcolor=#d6d6d6
| 539231 ||  || — || April 23, 2015 || Haleakala || Pan-STARRS ||  || align=right | 2.2 km || 
|-id=232 bgcolor=#fefefe
| 539232 ||  || — || June 30, 1997 || Prescott || P. G. Comba ||  || align=right | 1.1 km || 
|-id=233 bgcolor=#E9E9E9
| 539233 ||  || — || October 10, 2012 || Haleakala || Pan-STARRS ||  || align=right | 1.4 km || 
|-id=234 bgcolor=#d6d6d6
| 539234 ||  || — || December 27, 2006 || Mount Lemmon || Mount Lemmon Survey ||  || align=right | 3.3 km || 
|-id=235 bgcolor=#d6d6d6
| 539235 ||  || — || December 15, 2006 || Kitt Peak || Spacewatch ||  || align=right | 3.7 km || 
|-id=236 bgcolor=#E9E9E9
| 539236 ||  || — || April 24, 2015 || Haleakala || Pan-STARRS ||  || align=right | 2.1 km || 
|-id=237 bgcolor=#E9E9E9
| 539237 ||  || — || March 12, 2010 || Mount Lemmon || Mount Lemmon Survey ||  || align=right | 1.5 km || 
|-id=238 bgcolor=#E9E9E9
| 539238 ||  || — || September 25, 2012 || Catalina || CSS ||  || align=right | 1.8 km || 
|-id=239 bgcolor=#E9E9E9
| 539239 ||  || — || August 27, 2011 || Haleakala || Pan-STARRS ||  || align=right | 1.9 km || 
|-id=240 bgcolor=#E9E9E9
| 539240 ||  || — || March 30, 2011 || Mount Lemmon || Mount Lemmon Survey ||  || align=right data-sort-value="0.94" | 940 m || 
|-id=241 bgcolor=#fefefe
| 539241 ||  || — || May 19, 2012 || Mount Lemmon || Mount Lemmon Survey ||  || align=right data-sort-value="0.96" | 960 m || 
|-id=242 bgcolor=#fefefe
| 539242 ||  || — || February 8, 2007 || Mount Lemmon || Mount Lemmon Survey ||  || align=right | 1.2 km || 
|-id=243 bgcolor=#E9E9E9
| 539243 ||  || — || February 16, 2015 || Haleakala || Pan-STARRS ||  || align=right data-sort-value="0.67" | 670 m || 
|-id=244 bgcolor=#d6d6d6
| 539244 ||  || — || March 21, 2010 || WISE || WISE || Tj (2.98) || align=right | 4.8 km || 
|-id=245 bgcolor=#E9E9E9
| 539245 ||  || — || February 3, 2006 || Kitt Peak || Spacewatch ||  || align=right | 2.1 km || 
|-id=246 bgcolor=#E9E9E9
| 539246 ||  || — || October 19, 2012 || Haleakala || Pan-STARRS ||  || align=right | 1.9 km || 
|-id=247 bgcolor=#d6d6d6
| 539247 ||  || — || May 31, 2010 || WISE || WISE || 7:4 || align=right | 4.2 km || 
|-id=248 bgcolor=#fefefe
| 539248 ||  || — || March 20, 2015 || Haleakala || Pan-STARRS ||  || align=right data-sort-value="0.93" | 930 m || 
|-id=249 bgcolor=#E9E9E9
| 539249 ||  || — || April 2, 2011 || Haleakala || Pan-STARRS ||  || align=right | 1.1 km || 
|-id=250 bgcolor=#E9E9E9
| 539250 ||  || — || May 13, 2007 || Kitt Peak || Spacewatch ||  || align=right | 1.2 km || 
|-id=251 bgcolor=#d6d6d6
| 539251 ||  || — || February 20, 2014 || Mount Lemmon || Mount Lemmon Survey ||  || align=right | 2.9 km || 
|-id=252 bgcolor=#fefefe
| 539252 ||  || — || November 9, 2013 || Kitt Peak || Spacewatch ||  || align=right data-sort-value="0.65" | 650 m || 
|-id=253 bgcolor=#E9E9E9
| 539253 ||  || — || November 6, 2008 || Catalina || CSS ||  || align=right | 1.2 km || 
|-id=254 bgcolor=#fefefe
| 539254 ||  || — || January 17, 2015 || Haleakala || Pan-STARRS ||  || align=right data-sort-value="0.75" | 750 m || 
|-id=255 bgcolor=#E9E9E9
| 539255 ||  || — || June 21, 2007 || Mount Lemmon || Mount Lemmon Survey ||  || align=right | 2.5 km || 
|-id=256 bgcolor=#fefefe
| 539256 ||  || — || October 3, 2013 || Kitt Peak || Spacewatch ||  || align=right data-sort-value="0.66" | 660 m || 
|-id=257 bgcolor=#E9E9E9
| 539257 ||  || — || February 17, 2015 || Haleakala || Pan-STARRS ||  || align=right data-sort-value="0.71" | 710 m || 
|-id=258 bgcolor=#d6d6d6
| 539258 ||  || — || October 22, 2012 || Haleakala || Pan-STARRS ||  || align=right | 3.2 km || 
|-id=259 bgcolor=#d6d6d6
| 539259 ||  || — || February 11, 2014 || Mount Lemmon || Mount Lemmon Survey ||  || align=right | 2.1 km || 
|-id=260 bgcolor=#E9E9E9
| 539260 ||  || — || January 30, 2006 || Kitt Peak || Spacewatch ||  || align=right | 1.7 km || 
|-id=261 bgcolor=#d6d6d6
| 539261 ||  || — || November 19, 2006 || Catalina || CSS ||  || align=right | 3.2 km || 
|-id=262 bgcolor=#E9E9E9
| 539262 ||  || — || August 6, 2016 || Haleakala || Pan-STARRS ||  || align=right data-sort-value="0.82" | 820 m || 
|-id=263 bgcolor=#d6d6d6
| 539263 ||  || — || November 3, 2007 || Catalina || CSS ||  || align=right | 2.7 km || 
|-id=264 bgcolor=#E9E9E9
| 539264 ||  || — || October 30, 2008 || Kitt Peak || Spacewatch ||  || align=right | 1.5 km || 
|-id=265 bgcolor=#fefefe
| 539265 ||  || — || August 30, 2005 || Kitt Peak || Spacewatch ||  || align=right data-sort-value="0.71" | 710 m || 
|-id=266 bgcolor=#fefefe
| 539266 ||  || — || June 9, 2002 || Socorro || LINEAR ||  || align=right data-sort-value="0.98" | 980 m || 
|-id=267 bgcolor=#d6d6d6
| 539267 ||  || — || May 25, 2015 || Haleakala || Pan-STARRS ||  || align=right | 2.8 km || 
|-id=268 bgcolor=#d6d6d6
| 539268 ||  || — || February 9, 2008 || Kitt Peak || Spacewatch ||  || align=right | 3.6 km || 
|-id=269 bgcolor=#E9E9E9
| 539269 ||  || — || October 19, 2012 || Mount Lemmon || Mount Lemmon Survey ||  || align=right | 1.1 km || 
|-id=270 bgcolor=#E9E9E9
| 539270 ||  || — || August 2, 2016 || Haleakala || Pan-STARRS ||  || align=right | 1.8 km || 
|-id=271 bgcolor=#d6d6d6
| 539271 ||  || — || August 2, 2016 || Haleakala || Pan-STARRS ||  || align=right | 2.4 km || 
|-id=272 bgcolor=#d6d6d6
| 539272 ||  || — || May 18, 2015 || Haleakala || Pan-STARRS ||  || align=right | 2.0 km || 
|-id=273 bgcolor=#d6d6d6
| 539273 ||  || — || June 16, 2010 || WISE || WISE || 7:4 || align=right | 2.8 km || 
|-id=274 bgcolor=#d6d6d6
| 539274 ||  || — || October 24, 2005 || Kitt Peak || Spacewatch ||  || align=right | 2.7 km || 
|-id=275 bgcolor=#d6d6d6
| 539275 ||  || — || September 29, 2005 || Mount Lemmon || Mount Lemmon Survey ||  || align=right | 2.2 km || 
|-id=276 bgcolor=#E9E9E9
| 539276 ||  || — || February 24, 2006 || Kitt Peak || Spacewatch ||  || align=right | 1.6 km || 
|-id=277 bgcolor=#E9E9E9
| 539277 ||  || — || February 14, 2010 || WISE || WISE ||  || align=right | 2.3 km || 
|-id=278 bgcolor=#E9E9E9
| 539278 ||  || — || May 13, 2015 || Mount Lemmon || Mount Lemmon Survey ||  || align=right data-sort-value="0.78" | 780 m || 
|-id=279 bgcolor=#fefefe
| 539279 ||  || — || January 27, 2011 || Mount Lemmon || Mount Lemmon Survey ||  || align=right data-sort-value="0.69" | 690 m || 
|-id=280 bgcolor=#d6d6d6
| 539280 ||  || — || September 2, 2010 || Mount Lemmon || Mount Lemmon Survey ||  || align=right | 2.4 km || 
|-id=281 bgcolor=#d6d6d6
| 539281 ||  || — || October 30, 2005 || Mount Lemmon || Mount Lemmon Survey ||  || align=right | 3.3 km || 
|-id=282 bgcolor=#d6d6d6
| 539282 ||  || — || October 1, 2005 || Mount Lemmon || Mount Lemmon Survey ||  || align=right | 3.1 km || 
|-id=283 bgcolor=#E9E9E9
| 539283 ||  || — || May 8, 2006 || Mount Lemmon || Mount Lemmon Survey ||  || align=right | 1.8 km || 
|-id=284 bgcolor=#E9E9E9
| 539284 ||  || — || March 25, 2006 || Mount Lemmon || Mount Lemmon Survey ||  || align=right | 1.4 km || 
|-id=285 bgcolor=#fefefe
| 539285 ||  || — || September 30, 2006 || Mount Lemmon || Mount Lemmon Survey ||  || align=right data-sort-value="0.52" | 520 m || 
|-id=286 bgcolor=#d6d6d6
| 539286 ||  || — || September 25, 2011 || Haleakala || Pan-STARRS ||  || align=right | 2.2 km || 
|-id=287 bgcolor=#d6d6d6
| 539287 ||  || — || November 2, 2006 || Mount Lemmon || Mount Lemmon Survey ||  || align=right | 2.6 km || 
|-id=288 bgcolor=#d6d6d6
| 539288 ||  || — || June 11, 2015 || Haleakala || Pan-STARRS ||  || align=right | 2.8 km || 
|-id=289 bgcolor=#d6d6d6
| 539289 ||  || — || April 25, 2015 || Haleakala || Pan-STARRS ||  || align=right | 2.7 km || 
|-id=290 bgcolor=#d6d6d6
| 539290 ||  || — || February 24, 2014 || Haleakala || Pan-STARRS ||  || align=right | 3.1 km || 
|-id=291 bgcolor=#d6d6d6
| 539291 ||  || — || October 21, 2006 || Mount Lemmon || Mount Lemmon Survey ||  || align=right | 2.7 km || 
|-id=292 bgcolor=#d6d6d6
| 539292 ||  || — || May 12, 2015 || XuYi || PMO NEO ||  || align=right | 3.1 km || 
|-id=293 bgcolor=#E9E9E9
| 539293 ||  || — || August 24, 2011 || Haleakala || Pan-STARRS ||  || align=right | 2.6 km || 
|-id=294 bgcolor=#E9E9E9
| 539294 ||  || — || February 3, 2009 || Kitt Peak || Spacewatch ||  || align=right | 2.0 km || 
|-id=295 bgcolor=#E9E9E9
| 539295 ||  || — || March 13, 2007 || Mount Lemmon || Mount Lemmon Survey ||  || align=right | 1.1 km || 
|-id=296 bgcolor=#d6d6d6
| 539296 ||  || — || September 21, 2011 || Kitt Peak || Spacewatch ||  || align=right | 2.5 km || 
|-id=297 bgcolor=#d6d6d6
| 539297 ||  || — || February 16, 2013 || Mount Lemmon || Mount Lemmon Survey ||  || align=right | 3.0 km || 
|-id=298 bgcolor=#E9E9E9
| 539298 ||  || — || April 8, 2010 || Kitt Peak || Spacewatch ||  || align=right | 2.1 km || 
|-id=299 bgcolor=#E9E9E9
| 539299 ||  || — || September 4, 2007 || Mount Lemmon || Mount Lemmon Survey ||  || align=right | 1.9 km || 
|-id=300 bgcolor=#E9E9E9
| 539300 ||  || — || October 18, 2012 || Haleakala || Pan-STARRS ||  || align=right | 1.8 km || 
|}

539301–539400 

|-bgcolor=#E9E9E9
| 539301 ||  || — || October 16, 2007 || Mount Lemmon || Mount Lemmon Survey ||  || align=right | 2.0 km || 
|-id=302 bgcolor=#E9E9E9
| 539302 ||  || — || February 26, 2014 || Mount Lemmon || Mount Lemmon Survey ||  || align=right | 1.9 km || 
|-id=303 bgcolor=#E9E9E9
| 539303 ||  || — || September 15, 2007 || Mount Lemmon || Mount Lemmon Survey ||  || align=right | 2.0 km || 
|-id=304 bgcolor=#d6d6d6
| 539304 ||  || — || November 23, 2012 || Kitt Peak || Spacewatch ||  || align=right | 1.9 km || 
|-id=305 bgcolor=#E9E9E9
| 539305 ||  || — || April 11, 2007 || Mount Lemmon || Mount Lemmon Survey ||  || align=right data-sort-value="0.72" | 720 m || 
|-id=306 bgcolor=#E9E9E9
| 539306 ||  || — || April 15, 2007 || Mount Lemmon || Mount Lemmon Survey ||  || align=right data-sort-value="0.87" | 870 m || 
|-id=307 bgcolor=#E9E9E9
| 539307 ||  || — || October 5, 2007 || Kitt Peak || Spacewatch ||  || align=right | 1.9 km || 
|-id=308 bgcolor=#E9E9E9
| 539308 ||  || — || September 10, 2007 || Mount Lemmon || Mount Lemmon Survey ||  || align=right | 1.2 km || 
|-id=309 bgcolor=#E9E9E9
| 539309 ||  || — || September 14, 2007 || Mount Lemmon || Mount Lemmon Survey ||  || align=right | 1.8 km || 
|-id=310 bgcolor=#d6d6d6
| 539310 ||  || — || January 11, 2008 || Mount Lemmon || Mount Lemmon Survey ||  || align=right | 2.4 km || 
|-id=311 bgcolor=#d6d6d6
| 539311 ||  || — || August 2, 2016 || Haleakala || Pan-STARRS ||  || align=right | 2.9 km || 
|-id=312 bgcolor=#E9E9E9
| 539312 ||  || — || September 13, 2007 || Mount Lemmon || Mount Lemmon Survey ||  || align=right | 2.1 km || 
|-id=313 bgcolor=#E9E9E9
| 539313 ||  || — || April 20, 2010 || Kitt Peak || Spacewatch ||  || align=right | 2.1 km || 
|-id=314 bgcolor=#d6d6d6
| 539314 ||  || — || February 9, 2008 || Mount Lemmon || Mount Lemmon Survey ||  || align=right | 2.8 km || 
|-id=315 bgcolor=#d6d6d6
| 539315 ||  || — || March 29, 2008 || Kitt Peak || Spacewatch ||  || align=right | 3.0 km || 
|-id=316 bgcolor=#d6d6d6
| 539316 ||  || — || February 9, 2014 || Kitt Peak || Spacewatch ||  || align=right | 2.5 km || 
|-id=317 bgcolor=#d6d6d6
| 539317 ||  || — || October 25, 2011 || Haleakala || Pan-STARRS ||  || align=right | 2.5 km || 
|-id=318 bgcolor=#E9E9E9
| 539318 ||  || — || January 11, 2008 || Mount Lemmon || Mount Lemmon Survey ||  || align=right | 2.3 km || 
|-id=319 bgcolor=#d6d6d6
| 539319 ||  || — || January 10, 2008 || Mount Lemmon || Mount Lemmon Survey ||  || align=right | 2.6 km || 
|-id=320 bgcolor=#d6d6d6
| 539320 ||  || — || February 28, 2008 || Mount Lemmon || Mount Lemmon Survey ||  || align=right | 3.0 km || 
|-id=321 bgcolor=#d6d6d6
| 539321 ||  || — || December 18, 2007 || Mount Lemmon || Mount Lemmon Survey ||  || align=right | 2.2 km || 
|-id=322 bgcolor=#d6d6d6
| 539322 ||  || — || January 20, 2013 || Kitt Peak || Spacewatch ||  || align=right | 2.9 km || 
|-id=323 bgcolor=#d6d6d6
| 539323 ||  || — || August 30, 2011 || Haleakala || Pan-STARRS ||  || align=right | 2.8 km || 
|-id=324 bgcolor=#d6d6d6
| 539324 ||  || — || January 17, 2008 || Mount Lemmon || Mount Lemmon Survey ||  || align=right | 2.8 km || 
|-id=325 bgcolor=#d6d6d6
| 539325 ||  || — || August 10, 2016 || Haleakala || Pan-STARRS ||  || align=right | 2.1 km || 
|-id=326 bgcolor=#d6d6d6
| 539326 ||  || — || May 27, 2010 || WISE || WISE ||  || align=right | 4.0 km || 
|-id=327 bgcolor=#d6d6d6
| 539327 ||  || — || October 3, 1999 || Kitt Peak || Spacewatch ||  || align=right | 2.6 km || 
|-id=328 bgcolor=#fefefe
| 539328 ||  || — || August 28, 2005 || Kitt Peak || Spacewatch ||  || align=right data-sort-value="0.68" | 680 m || 
|-id=329 bgcolor=#E9E9E9
| 539329 ||  || — || October 10, 2007 || Mount Lemmon || Mount Lemmon Survey ||  || align=right | 1.7 km || 
|-id=330 bgcolor=#d6d6d6
| 539330 ||  || — || October 24, 2011 || Haleakala || Pan-STARRS ||  || align=right | 2.6 km || 
|-id=331 bgcolor=#E9E9E9
| 539331 ||  || — || October 8, 2008 || Mount Lemmon || Mount Lemmon Survey ||  || align=right | 1.5 km || 
|-id=332 bgcolor=#E9E9E9
| 539332 ||  || — || March 30, 2015 || Haleakala || Pan-STARRS ||  || align=right | 1.2 km || 
|-id=333 bgcolor=#E9E9E9
| 539333 ||  || — || October 6, 2008 || Mount Lemmon || Mount Lemmon Survey ||  || align=right data-sort-value="0.89" | 890 m || 
|-id=334 bgcolor=#E9E9E9
| 539334 ||  || — || September 6, 2008 || Mount Lemmon || Mount Lemmon Survey ||  || align=right | 1.1 km || 
|-id=335 bgcolor=#E9E9E9
| 539335 ||  || — || January 1, 2014 || Kitt Peak || Spacewatch ||  || align=right | 1.7 km || 
|-id=336 bgcolor=#E9E9E9
| 539336 ||  || — || April 5, 2011 || Kitt Peak || Spacewatch ||  || align=right data-sort-value="0.72" | 720 m || 
|-id=337 bgcolor=#E9E9E9
| 539337 ||  || — || October 9, 2008 || Mount Lemmon || Mount Lemmon Survey ||  || align=right | 1.3 km || 
|-id=338 bgcolor=#E9E9E9
| 539338 ||  || — || November 17, 1999 || Kitt Peak || Spacewatch ||  || align=right | 1.2 km || 
|-id=339 bgcolor=#E9E9E9
| 539339 ||  || — || January 18, 2009 || Mount Lemmon || Mount Lemmon Survey ||  || align=right | 1.8 km || 
|-id=340 bgcolor=#E9E9E9
| 539340 ||  || — || October 21, 2012 || Kitt Peak || Spacewatch ||  || align=right | 1.4 km || 
|-id=341 bgcolor=#d6d6d6
| 539341 ||  || — || April 10, 2014 || Haleakala || Pan-STARRS ||  || align=right | 3.2 km || 
|-id=342 bgcolor=#d6d6d6
| 539342 ||  || — || September 20, 2011 || Haleakala || Pan-STARRS ||  || align=right | 1.8 km || 
|-id=343 bgcolor=#fefefe
| 539343 ||  || — || January 20, 2015 || Haleakala || Pan-STARRS ||  || align=right data-sort-value="0.64" | 640 m || 
|-id=344 bgcolor=#fefefe
| 539344 ||  || — || January 20, 2015 || Haleakala || Pan-STARRS ||  || align=right data-sort-value="0.73" | 730 m || 
|-id=345 bgcolor=#d6d6d6
| 539345 ||  || — || August 27, 2011 || Haleakala || Pan-STARRS ||  || align=right | 2.1 km || 
|-id=346 bgcolor=#E9E9E9
| 539346 ||  || — || October 6, 2012 || Mount Lemmon || Mount Lemmon Survey ||  || align=right | 1.8 km || 
|-id=347 bgcolor=#fefefe
| 539347 ||  || — || December 31, 2013 || Mount Lemmon || Mount Lemmon Survey ||  || align=right | 1.0 km || 
|-id=348 bgcolor=#E9E9E9
| 539348 ||  || — || October 7, 2008 || Mount Lemmon || Mount Lemmon Survey ||  || align=right data-sort-value="0.99" | 990 m || 
|-id=349 bgcolor=#E9E9E9
| 539349 ||  || — || September 11, 2007 || Kitt Peak || Spacewatch ||  || align=right | 1.8 km || 
|-id=350 bgcolor=#E9E9E9
| 539350 ||  || — || September 11, 2007 || Mount Lemmon || Mount Lemmon Survey ||  || align=right | 1.4 km || 
|-id=351 bgcolor=#E9E9E9
| 539351 ||  || — || November 14, 2007 || Kitt Peak || Spacewatch ||  || align=right | 2.1 km || 
|-id=352 bgcolor=#E9E9E9
| 539352 ||  || — || September 10, 2007 || Mount Lemmon || Mount Lemmon Survey ||  || align=right | 1.7 km || 
|-id=353 bgcolor=#d6d6d6
| 539353 ||  || — || September 1, 2005 || Kitt Peak || Spacewatch ||  || align=right | 2.5 km || 
|-id=354 bgcolor=#E9E9E9
| 539354 ||  || — || February 16, 2010 || Mount Lemmon || Mount Lemmon Survey ||  || align=right | 1.5 km || 
|-id=355 bgcolor=#E9E9E9
| 539355 ||  || — || September 19, 2003 || Kitt Peak || Spacewatch ||  || align=right | 1.7 km || 
|-id=356 bgcolor=#E9E9E9
| 539356 ||  || — || October 25, 2008 || Kitt Peak || Spacewatch ||  || align=right | 1.8 km || 
|-id=357 bgcolor=#E9E9E9
| 539357 ||  || — || March 21, 2002 || Kitt Peak || Spacewatch ||  || align=right | 1.2 km || 
|-id=358 bgcolor=#E9E9E9
| 539358 ||  || — || September 16, 2003 || Kitt Peak || Spacewatch ||  || align=right | 1.2 km || 
|-id=359 bgcolor=#E9E9E9
| 539359 ||  || — || August 10, 2007 || Kitt Peak || Spacewatch ||  || align=right | 1.2 km || 
|-id=360 bgcolor=#E9E9E9
| 539360 ||  || — || September 12, 2007 || Mount Lemmon || Mount Lemmon Survey ||  || align=right | 1.4 km || 
|-id=361 bgcolor=#E9E9E9
| 539361 ||  || — || February 17, 2010 || Kitt Peak || Spacewatch ||  || align=right | 1.2 km || 
|-id=362 bgcolor=#E9E9E9
| 539362 ||  || — || November 23, 2012 || Kitt Peak || Spacewatch ||  || align=right | 1.2 km || 
|-id=363 bgcolor=#d6d6d6
| 539363 ||  || — || January 25, 2007 || Kitt Peak || Spacewatch ||  || align=right | 3.2 km || 
|-id=364 bgcolor=#E9E9E9
| 539364 ||  || — || September 21, 2003 || Kitt Peak || Spacewatch ||  || align=right | 1.4 km || 
|-id=365 bgcolor=#d6d6d6
| 539365 ||  || — || February 26, 2014 || Mount Lemmon || Mount Lemmon Survey ||  || align=right | 2.8 km || 
|-id=366 bgcolor=#d6d6d6
| 539366 ||  || — || December 22, 2012 || Haleakala || Pan-STARRS ||  || align=right | 2.6 km || 
|-id=367 bgcolor=#d6d6d6
| 539367 ||  || — || November 14, 2007 || Kitt Peak || Spacewatch ||  || align=right | 2.3 km || 
|-id=368 bgcolor=#E9E9E9
| 539368 ||  || — || October 20, 2012 || Haleakala || Pan-STARRS ||  || align=right | 2.4 km || 
|-id=369 bgcolor=#E9E9E9
| 539369 ||  || — || September 16, 2012 || Mount Lemmon || Mount Lemmon Survey ||  || align=right | 1.2 km || 
|-id=370 bgcolor=#E9E9E9
| 539370 ||  || — || October 11, 2007 || Mount Lemmon || Mount Lemmon Survey ||  || align=right | 2.0 km || 
|-id=371 bgcolor=#E9E9E9
| 539371 ||  || — || October 21, 2003 || Kitt Peak || Spacewatch ||  || align=right | 1.4 km || 
|-id=372 bgcolor=#E9E9E9
| 539372 ||  || — || May 21, 2006 || Kitt Peak || Spacewatch ||  || align=right | 1.5 km || 
|-id=373 bgcolor=#E9E9E9
| 539373 ||  || — || November 12, 2007 || Mount Lemmon || Mount Lemmon Survey ||  || align=right | 2.4 km || 
|-id=374 bgcolor=#E9E9E9
| 539374 ||  || — || April 26, 2007 || Kitt Peak || Spacewatch ||  || align=right data-sort-value="0.78" | 780 m || 
|-id=375 bgcolor=#d6d6d6
| 539375 ||  || — || September 11, 2005 || Kitt Peak || Spacewatch ||  || align=right | 2.9 km || 
|-id=376 bgcolor=#E9E9E9
| 539376 ||  || — || March 24, 2015 || Mount Lemmon || Mount Lemmon Survey ||  || align=right | 1.1 km || 
|-id=377 bgcolor=#E9E9E9
| 539377 ||  || — || September 19, 2008 || Kitt Peak || Spacewatch ||  || align=right data-sort-value="0.86" | 860 m || 
|-id=378 bgcolor=#E9E9E9
| 539378 ||  || — || December 4, 2008 || Mount Lemmon || Mount Lemmon Survey ||  || align=right | 1.9 km || 
|-id=379 bgcolor=#E9E9E9
| 539379 ||  || — || April 30, 2003 || Kitt Peak || Spacewatch ||  || align=right data-sort-value="0.78" | 780 m || 
|-id=380 bgcolor=#d6d6d6
| 539380 ||  || — || February 6, 2013 || Catalina || CSS ||  || align=right | 3.5 km || 
|-id=381 bgcolor=#E9E9E9
| 539381 ||  || — || August 26, 2012 || Haleakala || Pan-STARRS ||  || align=right | 1.2 km || 
|-id=382 bgcolor=#d6d6d6
| 539382 ||  || — || December 12, 2012 || Mount Lemmon || Mount Lemmon Survey ||  || align=right | 2.0 km || 
|-id=383 bgcolor=#d6d6d6
| 539383 ||  || — || December 23, 2012 || Haleakala || Pan-STARRS ||  || align=right | 2.4 km || 
|-id=384 bgcolor=#E9E9E9
| 539384 ||  || — || March 21, 2015 || Haleakala || Pan-STARRS ||  || align=right | 1.2 km || 
|-id=385 bgcolor=#E9E9E9
| 539385 ||  || — || October 17, 2012 || Haleakala || Pan-STARRS ||  || align=right | 1.3 km || 
|-id=386 bgcolor=#d6d6d6
| 539386 ||  || — || June 2, 2016 || Mount Lemmon || Mount Lemmon Survey ||  || align=right | 3.6 km || 
|-id=387 bgcolor=#d6d6d6
| 539387 ||  || — || September 12, 2007 || Kitt Peak || Spacewatch ||  || align=right | 2.0 km || 
|-id=388 bgcolor=#d6d6d6
| 539388 ||  || — || August 2, 2016 || Haleakala || Pan-STARRS ||  || align=right | 2.7 km || 
|-id=389 bgcolor=#E9E9E9
| 539389 ||  || — || January 30, 2011 || Haleakala || Pan-STARRS ||  || align=right | 1.0 km || 
|-id=390 bgcolor=#E9E9E9
| 539390 ||  || — || September 23, 2008 || Mount Lemmon || Mount Lemmon Survey ||  || align=right data-sort-value="0.82" | 820 m || 
|-id=391 bgcolor=#E9E9E9
| 539391 ||  || — || October 9, 2012 || Mount Lemmon || Mount Lemmon Survey ||  || align=right | 1.4 km || 
|-id=392 bgcolor=#d6d6d6
| 539392 ||  || — || April 27, 2009 || Mount Lemmon || Mount Lemmon Survey ||  || align=right | 2.4 km || 
|-id=393 bgcolor=#d6d6d6
| 539393 ||  || — || February 9, 2008 || Kitt Peak || Spacewatch ||  || align=right | 2.8 km || 
|-id=394 bgcolor=#d6d6d6
| 539394 ||  || — || September 21, 2011 || Kitt Peak || Spacewatch ||  || align=right | 2.8 km || 
|-id=395 bgcolor=#d6d6d6
| 539395 ||  || — || February 13, 2008 || Mount Lemmon || Mount Lemmon Survey ||  || align=right | 3.1 km || 
|-id=396 bgcolor=#E9E9E9
| 539396 ||  || — || August 2, 2016 || Haleakala || Pan-STARRS ||  || align=right | 1.2 km || 
|-id=397 bgcolor=#d6d6d6
| 539397 ||  || — || February 28, 2014 || Haleakala || Pan-STARRS ||  || align=right | 2.2 km || 
|-id=398 bgcolor=#E9E9E9
| 539398 ||  || — || May 29, 2011 || Mount Lemmon || Mount Lemmon Survey ||  || align=right | 1.4 km || 
|-id=399 bgcolor=#d6d6d6
| 539399 ||  || — || May 21, 2010 || WISE || WISE ||  || align=right | 3.1 km || 
|-id=400 bgcolor=#E9E9E9
| 539400 ||  || — || March 23, 2006 || Kitt Peak || Spacewatch ||  || align=right | 1.9 km || 
|}

539401–539500 

|-bgcolor=#d6d6d6
| 539401 ||  || — || September 23, 2011 || Haleakala || Pan-STARRS ||  || align=right | 2.4 km || 
|-id=402 bgcolor=#E9E9E9
| 539402 ||  || — || April 25, 2015 || Haleakala || Pan-STARRS ||  || align=right | 1.3 km || 
|-id=403 bgcolor=#E9E9E9
| 539403 ||  || — || October 21, 2012 || Haleakala || Pan-STARRS ||  || align=right | 1.3 km || 
|-id=404 bgcolor=#d6d6d6
| 539404 ||  || — || September 18, 2011 || Mount Lemmon || Mount Lemmon Survey ||  || align=right | 2.2 km || 
|-id=405 bgcolor=#E9E9E9
| 539405 ||  || — || July 18, 2007 || Mount Lemmon || Mount Lemmon Survey ||  || align=right | 1.8 km || 
|-id=406 bgcolor=#E9E9E9
| 539406 ||  || — || September 6, 2008 || Mount Lemmon || Mount Lemmon Survey ||  || align=right data-sort-value="0.87" | 870 m || 
|-id=407 bgcolor=#E9E9E9
| 539407 ||  || — || September 10, 2007 || Kitt Peak || Spacewatch ||  || align=right | 1.8 km || 
|-id=408 bgcolor=#d6d6d6
| 539408 ||  || — || February 24, 2014 || Haleakala || Pan-STARRS ||  || align=right | 2.6 km || 
|-id=409 bgcolor=#E9E9E9
| 539409 ||  || — || November 26, 2012 || Mount Lemmon || Mount Lemmon Survey ||  || align=right | 1.8 km || 
|-id=410 bgcolor=#E9E9E9
| 539410 ||  || — || May 22, 2011 || Mount Lemmon || Mount Lemmon Survey ||  || align=right | 1.3 km || 
|-id=411 bgcolor=#E9E9E9
| 539411 ||  || — || January 20, 2015 || Haleakala || Pan-STARRS ||  || align=right | 1.8 km || 
|-id=412 bgcolor=#fefefe
| 539412 ||  || — || April 19, 2004 || Kitt Peak || Spacewatch ||  || align=right data-sort-value="0.62" | 620 m || 
|-id=413 bgcolor=#d6d6d6
| 539413 ||  || — || September 18, 2011 || Mount Lemmon || Mount Lemmon Survey ||  || align=right | 2.3 km || 
|-id=414 bgcolor=#E9E9E9
| 539414 ||  || — || January 11, 2014 || Kitt Peak || Spacewatch ||  || align=right | 1.5 km || 
|-id=415 bgcolor=#E9E9E9
| 539415 ||  || — || April 30, 2006 || Kitt Peak || Spacewatch ||  || align=right | 1.2 km || 
|-id=416 bgcolor=#d6d6d6
| 539416 ||  || — || April 21, 2014 || Mount Lemmon || Mount Lemmon Survey ||  || align=right | 2.3 km || 
|-id=417 bgcolor=#d6d6d6
| 539417 ||  || — || October 24, 2011 || Haleakala || Pan-STARRS ||  || align=right | 2.3 km || 
|-id=418 bgcolor=#E9E9E9
| 539418 ||  || — || October 10, 2012 || Haleakala || Pan-STARRS ||  || align=right | 1.7 km || 
|-id=419 bgcolor=#d6d6d6
| 539419 ||  || — || June 21, 2010 || WISE || WISE ||  || align=right | 2.8 km || 
|-id=420 bgcolor=#d6d6d6
| 539420 ||  || — || November 16, 2011 || Mount Lemmon || Mount Lemmon Survey ||  || align=right | 1.7 km || 
|-id=421 bgcolor=#E9E9E9
| 539421 ||  || — || October 10, 2007 || Mount Lemmon || Mount Lemmon Survey ||  || align=right | 1.9 km || 
|-id=422 bgcolor=#E9E9E9
| 539422 ||  || — || October 22, 2012 || Kitt Peak || Spacewatch ||  || align=right | 1.2 km || 
|-id=423 bgcolor=#d6d6d6
| 539423 ||  || — || March 19, 2013 || Haleakala || Pan-STARRS ||  || align=right | 2.6 km || 
|-id=424 bgcolor=#d6d6d6
| 539424 ||  || — || August 29, 2006 || Kitt Peak || Spacewatch ||  || align=right | 2.4 km || 
|-id=425 bgcolor=#d6d6d6
| 539425 ||  || — || August 28, 2005 || Kitt Peak || Spacewatch ||  || align=right | 2.3 km || 
|-id=426 bgcolor=#E9E9E9
| 539426 ||  || — || February 25, 2006 || Kitt Peak || Spacewatch ||  || align=right | 1.2 km || 
|-id=427 bgcolor=#d6d6d6
| 539427 ||  || — || February 28, 2014 || Haleakala || Pan-STARRS ||  || align=right | 2.5 km || 
|-id=428 bgcolor=#E9E9E9
| 539428 ||  || — || December 31, 2013 || Kitt Peak || Spacewatch ||  || align=right | 1.9 km || 
|-id=429 bgcolor=#E9E9E9
| 539429 ||  || — || April 28, 2011 || Kitt Peak || Spacewatch ||  || align=right data-sort-value="0.85" | 850 m || 
|-id=430 bgcolor=#E9E9E9
| 539430 ||  || — || March 18, 2010 || Mount Lemmon || Mount Lemmon Survey ||  || align=right | 2.0 km || 
|-id=431 bgcolor=#E9E9E9
| 539431 ||  || — || October 8, 2012 || Kitt Peak || Spacewatch ||  || align=right | 1.2 km || 
|-id=432 bgcolor=#E9E9E9
| 539432 ||  || — || September 11, 2007 || Kitt Peak || Spacewatch ||  || align=right | 1.7 km || 
|-id=433 bgcolor=#d6d6d6
| 539433 ||  || — || March 8, 2013 || Haleakala || Pan-STARRS ||  || align=right | 2.6 km || 
|-id=434 bgcolor=#E9E9E9
| 539434 ||  || — || November 6, 2008 || Kitt Peak || Spacewatch ||  || align=right | 1.1 km || 
|-id=435 bgcolor=#d6d6d6
| 539435 ||  || — || January 11, 2008 || Kitt Peak || Spacewatch ||  || align=right | 2.9 km || 
|-id=436 bgcolor=#d6d6d6
| 539436 ||  || — || August 1, 2016 || Haleakala || Pan-STARRS ||  || align=right | 2.5 km || 
|-id=437 bgcolor=#E9E9E9
| 539437 ||  || — || August 1, 2016 || Haleakala || Pan-STARRS ||  || align=right data-sort-value="0.97" | 970 m || 
|-id=438 bgcolor=#E9E9E9
| 539438 ||  || — || February 28, 2014 || Haleakala || Pan-STARRS ||  || align=right | 1.9 km || 
|-id=439 bgcolor=#E9E9E9
| 539439 ||  || — || October 15, 2012 || Haleakala || Pan-STARRS ||  || align=right | 1.6 km || 
|-id=440 bgcolor=#E9E9E9
| 539440 ||  || — || September 17, 2003 || Kitt Peak || Spacewatch ||  || align=right | 2.1 km || 
|-id=441 bgcolor=#fefefe
| 539441 ||  || — || May 8, 2008 || Kitt Peak || Spacewatch ||  || align=right data-sort-value="0.75" | 750 m || 
|-id=442 bgcolor=#fefefe
| 539442 ||  || — || May 1, 2012 || Mount Lemmon || Mount Lemmon Survey ||  || align=right data-sort-value="0.57" | 570 m || 
|-id=443 bgcolor=#d6d6d6
| 539443 ||  || — || August 23, 2011 || Haleakala || Pan-STARRS ||  || align=right | 2.7 km || 
|-id=444 bgcolor=#fefefe
| 539444 ||  || — || November 28, 2013 || Haleakala || Pan-STARRS ||  || align=right data-sort-value="0.80" | 800 m || 
|-id=445 bgcolor=#E9E9E9
| 539445 ||  || — || April 24, 2007 || Mount Lemmon || Mount Lemmon Survey ||  || align=right | 1.3 km || 
|-id=446 bgcolor=#E9E9E9
| 539446 ||  || — || October 7, 2012 || Haleakala || Pan-STARRS ||  || align=right | 1.6 km || 
|-id=447 bgcolor=#E9E9E9
| 539447 ||  || — || July 3, 2003 || Kitt Peak || Spacewatch ||  || align=right | 1.6 km || 
|-id=448 bgcolor=#d6d6d6
| 539448 ||  || — || February 3, 2013 || Haleakala || Pan-STARRS ||  || align=right | 3.2 km || 
|-id=449 bgcolor=#E9E9E9
| 539449 ||  || — || January 18, 2009 || Kitt Peak || Spacewatch ||  || align=right | 1.5 km || 
|-id=450 bgcolor=#E9E9E9
| 539450 ||  || — || September 19, 2012 || Mount Lemmon || Mount Lemmon Survey ||  || align=right | 1.8 km || 
|-id=451 bgcolor=#d6d6d6
| 539451 ||  || — || April 24, 2010 || WISE || WISE ||  || align=right | 3.9 km || 
|-id=452 bgcolor=#d6d6d6
| 539452 ||  || — || October 22, 2011 || Kitt Peak || Spacewatch ||  || align=right | 2.9 km || 
|-id=453 bgcolor=#E9E9E9
| 539453 ||  || — || May 19, 2015 || Haleakala || Pan-STARRS ||  || align=right | 2.4 km || 
|-id=454 bgcolor=#d6d6d6
| 539454 ||  || — || October 30, 2011 || Mount Lemmon || Mount Lemmon Survey ||  || align=right | 2.8 km || 
|-id=455 bgcolor=#d6d6d6
| 539455 ||  || — || September 19, 2011 || Haleakala || Pan-STARRS ||  || align=right | 2.7 km || 
|-id=456 bgcolor=#d6d6d6
| 539456 ||  || — || October 24, 2007 || Mount Lemmon || Mount Lemmon Survey ||  || align=right | 2.6 km || 
|-id=457 bgcolor=#fefefe
| 539457 ||  || — || June 10, 2005 || Kitt Peak || Spacewatch ||  || align=right data-sort-value="0.62" | 620 m || 
|-id=458 bgcolor=#E9E9E9
| 539458 ||  || — || August 13, 2007 || Socorro || LINEAR ||  || align=right | 2.3 km || 
|-id=459 bgcolor=#d6d6d6
| 539459 ||  || — || August 26, 2016 || Haleakala || Pan-STARRS ||  || align=right | 2.8 km || 
|-id=460 bgcolor=#d6d6d6
| 539460 ||  || — || September 4, 2011 || Haleakala || Pan-STARRS ||  || align=right | 2.7 km || 
|-id=461 bgcolor=#E9E9E9
| 539461 ||  || — || September 25, 2008 || Kitt Peak || Spacewatch ||  || align=right data-sort-value="0.77" | 770 m || 
|-id=462 bgcolor=#E9E9E9
| 539462 ||  || — || October 8, 2008 || Kitt Peak || Spacewatch ||  || align=right data-sort-value="0.87" | 870 m || 
|-id=463 bgcolor=#fefefe
| 539463 ||  || — || February 23, 2007 || Mount Lemmon || Mount Lemmon Survey ||  || align=right | 1.1 km || 
|-id=464 bgcolor=#fefefe
| 539464 ||  || — || January 23, 2015 || Haleakala || Pan-STARRS ||  || align=right data-sort-value="0.88" | 880 m || 
|-id=465 bgcolor=#E9E9E9
| 539465 ||  || — || May 18, 2015 || Haleakala || Pan-STARRS ||  || align=right | 1.1 km || 
|-id=466 bgcolor=#E9E9E9
| 539466 ||  || — || May 29, 2011 || Kitt Peak || Spacewatch ||  || align=right | 1.3 km || 
|-id=467 bgcolor=#fefefe
| 539467 ||  || — || May 10, 2012 || Siding Spring || SSS ||  || align=right data-sort-value="0.92" | 920 m || 
|-id=468 bgcolor=#d6d6d6
| 539468 ||  || — || January 16, 2008 || Kitt Peak || Spacewatch ||  || align=right | 3.1 km || 
|-id=469 bgcolor=#E9E9E9
| 539469 ||  || — || October 1, 2003 || Kitt Peak || Spacewatch ||  || align=right | 2.1 km || 
|-id=470 bgcolor=#E9E9E9
| 539470 ||  || — || February 16, 2010 || Mount Lemmon || Mount Lemmon Survey ||  || align=right | 2.9 km || 
|-id=471 bgcolor=#fefefe
| 539471 ||  || — || October 2, 2006 || Mount Lemmon || Mount Lemmon Survey ||  || align=right data-sort-value="0.62" | 620 m || 
|-id=472 bgcolor=#E9E9E9
| 539472 ||  || — || February 13, 2010 || Catalina || CSS ||  || align=right | 2.2 km || 
|-id=473 bgcolor=#E9E9E9
| 539473 ||  || — || August 25, 2012 || Haleakala || Pan-STARRS ||  || align=right | 1.00 km || 
|-id=474 bgcolor=#E9E9E9
| 539474 ||  || — || September 18, 2012 || Mount Lemmon || Mount Lemmon Survey ||  || align=right | 2.0 km || 
|-id=475 bgcolor=#fefefe
| 539475 ||  || — || June 16, 2009 || Mount Lemmon || Mount Lemmon Survey ||  || align=right data-sort-value="0.67" | 670 m || 
|-id=476 bgcolor=#d6d6d6
| 539476 ||  || — || July 1, 2011 || Kitt Peak || Spacewatch ||  || align=right | 2.2 km || 
|-id=477 bgcolor=#fefefe
| 539477 ||  || — || April 29, 2008 || Mount Lemmon || Mount Lemmon Survey ||  || align=right | 1.0 km || 
|-id=478 bgcolor=#d6d6d6
| 539478 ||  || — || June 6, 2015 || Haleakala || Pan-STARRS ||  || align=right | 2.8 km || 
|-id=479 bgcolor=#E9E9E9
| 539479 ||  || — || April 19, 1998 || Kitt Peak || Spacewatch ||  || align=right | 1.3 km || 
|-id=480 bgcolor=#d6d6d6
| 539480 ||  || — || July 11, 2016 || Haleakala || Pan-STARRS ||  || align=right | 2.3 km || 
|-id=481 bgcolor=#fefefe
| 539481 ||  || — || May 12, 2012 || Haleakala || Pan-STARRS ||  || align=right data-sort-value="0.57" | 570 m || 
|-id=482 bgcolor=#d6d6d6
| 539482 ||  || — || February 28, 2014 || Haleakala || Pan-STARRS ||  || align=right | 2.3 km || 
|-id=483 bgcolor=#E9E9E9
| 539483 ||  || — || November 19, 2003 || Kitt Peak || Spacewatch ||  || align=right | 1.9 km || 
|-id=484 bgcolor=#E9E9E9
| 539484 ||  || — || October 22, 2012 || Mount Lemmon || Mount Lemmon Survey ||  || align=right | 1.9 km || 
|-id=485 bgcolor=#E9E9E9
| 539485 ||  || — || October 9, 1999 || Kitt Peak || Spacewatch ||  || align=right | 1.3 km || 
|-id=486 bgcolor=#E9E9E9
| 539486 ||  || — || March 4, 2006 || Kitt Peak || Spacewatch ||  || align=right | 1.6 km || 
|-id=487 bgcolor=#d6d6d6
| 539487 ||  || — || January 20, 2009 || Mount Lemmon || Mount Lemmon Survey ||  || align=right | 4.1 km || 
|-id=488 bgcolor=#d6d6d6
| 539488 ||  || — || August 14, 2016 || Haleakala || Pan-STARRS ||  || align=right | 2.7 km || 
|-id=489 bgcolor=#d6d6d6
| 539489 ||  || — || August 2, 2016 || Haleakala || Pan-STARRS ||  || align=right | 2.4 km || 
|-id=490 bgcolor=#E9E9E9
| 539490 ||  || — || January 20, 2015 || Haleakala || Pan-STARRS ||  || align=right | 1.0 km || 
|-id=491 bgcolor=#E9E9E9
| 539491 ||  || — || January 6, 2006 || Mount Lemmon || Mount Lemmon Survey ||  || align=right | 1.7 km || 
|-id=492 bgcolor=#E9E9E9
| 539492 ||  || — || December 9, 2004 || Kitt Peak || Spacewatch ||  || align=right | 2.4 km || 
|-id=493 bgcolor=#E9E9E9
| 539493 ||  || — || April 18, 2015 || Haleakala || Pan-STARRS ||  || align=right | 2.2 km || 
|-id=494 bgcolor=#d6d6d6
| 539494 ||  || — || January 13, 2010 || WISE || WISE ||  || align=right | 3.2 km || 
|-id=495 bgcolor=#E9E9E9
| 539495 ||  || — || November 6, 2008 || Mount Lemmon || Mount Lemmon Survey ||  || align=right | 1.6 km || 
|-id=496 bgcolor=#fefefe
| 539496 ||  || — || March 26, 2008 || Kitt Peak || Spacewatch ||  || align=right | 1.00 km || 
|-id=497 bgcolor=#d6d6d6
| 539497 ||  || — || March 1, 2008 || Kitt Peak || Spacewatch ||  || align=right | 3.3 km || 
|-id=498 bgcolor=#d6d6d6
| 539498 ||  || — || August 16, 2016 || Haleakala || Pan-STARRS ||  || align=right | 3.1 km || 
|-id=499 bgcolor=#d6d6d6
| 539499 ||  || — || August 28, 2011 || Haleakala || Pan-STARRS ||  || align=right | 2.1 km || 
|-id=500 bgcolor=#E9E9E9
| 539500 ||  || — || September 23, 2008 || Kitt Peak || Spacewatch ||  || align=right | 1.0 km || 
|}

539501–539600 

|-bgcolor=#d6d6d6
| 539501 ||  || — || March 8, 2008 || Mount Lemmon || Mount Lemmon Survey ||  || align=right | 3.0 km || 
|-id=502 bgcolor=#E9E9E9
| 539502 ||  || — || March 13, 2010 || Mount Lemmon || Mount Lemmon Survey ||  || align=right | 1.7 km || 
|-id=503 bgcolor=#E9E9E9
| 539503 ||  || — || July 4, 2010 || WISE || WISE ||  || align=right | 2.4 km || 
|-id=504 bgcolor=#E9E9E9
| 539504 ||  || — || September 4, 2007 || Mount Lemmon || Mount Lemmon Survey ||  || align=right | 1.1 km || 
|-id=505 bgcolor=#d6d6d6
| 539505 ||  || — || April 6, 2008 || Mount Lemmon || Mount Lemmon Survey ||  || align=right | 2.4 km || 
|-id=506 bgcolor=#d6d6d6
| 539506 ||  || — || November 15, 2011 || Mount Lemmon || Mount Lemmon Survey ||  || align=right | 2.9 km || 
|-id=507 bgcolor=#d6d6d6
| 539507 ||  || — || September 23, 2011 || Kitt Peak || Spacewatch ||  || align=right | 2.7 km || 
|-id=508 bgcolor=#d6d6d6
| 539508 ||  || — || April 19, 2009 || Mount Lemmon || Mount Lemmon Survey ||  || align=right | 3.5 km || 
|-id=509 bgcolor=#d6d6d6
| 539509 ||  || — || January 18, 2008 || Mount Lemmon || Mount Lemmon Survey ||  || align=right | 2.5 km || 
|-id=510 bgcolor=#E9E9E9
| 539510 ||  || — || December 25, 2013 || Mount Lemmon || Mount Lemmon Survey ||  || align=right | 1.4 km || 
|-id=511 bgcolor=#d6d6d6
| 539511 ||  || — || September 18, 2006 || Kitt Peak || Spacewatch ||  || align=right | 2.0 km || 
|-id=512 bgcolor=#d6d6d6
| 539512 ||  || — || December 22, 2012 || Haleakala || Pan-STARRS ||  || align=right | 2.5 km || 
|-id=513 bgcolor=#E9E9E9
| 539513 ||  || — || September 29, 2003 || Kitt Peak || Spacewatch ||  || align=right | 1.8 km || 
|-id=514 bgcolor=#d6d6d6
| 539514 ||  || — || September 28, 2006 || Kitt Peak || Spacewatch ||  || align=right | 3.7 km || 
|-id=515 bgcolor=#E9E9E9
| 539515 ||  || — || September 14, 2007 || Mount Lemmon || Mount Lemmon Survey ||  || align=right | 1.8 km || 
|-id=516 bgcolor=#E9E9E9
| 539516 ||  || — || September 14, 2007 || Catalina || CSS ||  || align=right | 2.0 km || 
|-id=517 bgcolor=#E9E9E9
| 539517 ||  || — || October 9, 2008 || Kitt Peak || Spacewatch ||  || align=right data-sort-value="0.91" | 910 m || 
|-id=518 bgcolor=#d6d6d6
| 539518 ||  || — || October 19, 2006 || Kitt Peak || Spacewatch ||  || align=right | 2.3 km || 
|-id=519 bgcolor=#d6d6d6
| 539519 ||  || — || August 27, 2016 || Haleakala || Pan-STARRS ||  || align=right | 2.3 km || 
|-id=520 bgcolor=#E9E9E9
| 539520 ||  || — || October 9, 2007 || Kitt Peak || Spacewatch ||  || align=right | 2.0 km || 
|-id=521 bgcolor=#E9E9E9
| 539521 ||  || — || August 27, 2016 || Haleakala || Pan-STARRS ||  || align=right | 1.8 km || 
|-id=522 bgcolor=#d6d6d6
| 539522 ||  || — || December 8, 2012 || Kitt Peak || Spacewatch ||  || align=right | 2.8 km || 
|-id=523 bgcolor=#d6d6d6
| 539523 ||  || — || March 8, 2013 || Haleakala || Pan-STARRS ||  || align=right | 2.6 km || 
|-id=524 bgcolor=#E9E9E9
| 539524 ||  || — || February 10, 2014 || Haleakala || Pan-STARRS ||  || align=right | 2.3 km || 
|-id=525 bgcolor=#d6d6d6
| 539525 ||  || — || April 4, 2014 || Haleakala || Pan-STARRS ||  || align=right | 2.6 km || 
|-id=526 bgcolor=#d6d6d6
| 539526 ||  || — || September 21, 2011 || Kitt Peak || Spacewatch ||  || align=right | 2.3 km || 
|-id=527 bgcolor=#d6d6d6
| 539527 ||  || — || August 30, 2016 || Haleakala || Pan-STARRS ||  || align=right | 2.7 km || 
|-id=528 bgcolor=#d6d6d6
| 539528 ||  || — || August 15, 2016 || Haleakala || Pan-STARRS ||  || align=right | 3.3 km || 
|-id=529 bgcolor=#d6d6d6
| 539529 ||  || — || July 5, 2010 || Kitt Peak || Spacewatch ||  || align=right | 3.0 km || 
|-id=530 bgcolor=#E9E9E9
| 539530 ||  || — || October 22, 2012 || Haleakala || Pan-STARRS ||  || align=right | 1.8 km || 
|-id=531 bgcolor=#d6d6d6
| 539531 ||  || — || October 22, 2011 || Mount Lemmon || Mount Lemmon Survey ||  || align=right | 3.1 km || 
|-id=532 bgcolor=#d6d6d6
| 539532 ||  || — || February 28, 2008 || Kitt Peak || Spacewatch ||  || align=right | 3.1 km || 
|-id=533 bgcolor=#d6d6d6
| 539533 ||  || — || January 1, 2008 || Mount Lemmon || Mount Lemmon Survey ||  || align=right | 3.9 km || 
|-id=534 bgcolor=#E9E9E9
| 539534 ||  || — || September 23, 2008 || Kitt Peak || Spacewatch ||  || align=right data-sort-value="0.74" | 740 m || 
|-id=535 bgcolor=#d6d6d6
| 539535 ||  || — || December 30, 2007 || Mount Lemmon || Mount Lemmon Survey ||  || align=right | 3.3 km || 
|-id=536 bgcolor=#d6d6d6
| 539536 ||  || — || September 18, 2011 || Mount Lemmon || Mount Lemmon Survey ||  || align=right | 2.7 km || 
|-id=537 bgcolor=#d6d6d6
| 539537 ||  || — || March 9, 2008 || Mount Lemmon || Mount Lemmon Survey ||  || align=right | 3.0 km || 
|-id=538 bgcolor=#fefefe
| 539538 ||  || — || February 27, 2012 || Haleakala || Pan-STARRS ||  || align=right data-sort-value="0.62" | 620 m || 
|-id=539 bgcolor=#E9E9E9
| 539539 ||  || — || September 19, 2003 || Kitt Peak || Spacewatch ||  || align=right data-sort-value="0.96" | 960 m || 
|-id=540 bgcolor=#d6d6d6
| 539540 ||  || — || January 13, 2013 || Catalina || CSS ||  || align=right | 2.9 km || 
|-id=541 bgcolor=#d6d6d6
| 539541 ||  || — || September 26, 2011 || Mount Lemmon || Mount Lemmon Survey ||  || align=right | 2.2 km || 
|-id=542 bgcolor=#d6d6d6
| 539542 ||  || — || January 30, 2009 || Mount Lemmon || Mount Lemmon Survey ||  || align=right | 2.7 km || 
|-id=543 bgcolor=#E9E9E9
| 539543 ||  || — || October 10, 2012 || Kitt Peak || Spacewatch ||  || align=right | 1.5 km || 
|-id=544 bgcolor=#fefefe
| 539544 ||  || — || May 20, 2012 || Mount Lemmon || Mount Lemmon Survey ||  || align=right data-sort-value="0.75" | 750 m || 
|-id=545 bgcolor=#fefefe
| 539545 ||  || — || February 9, 2008 || Kitt Peak || Spacewatch ||  || align=right data-sort-value="0.70" | 700 m || 
|-id=546 bgcolor=#d6d6d6
| 539546 ||  || — || May 19, 2004 || Campo Imperatore || CINEOS ||  || align=right | 2.7 km || 
|-id=547 bgcolor=#d6d6d6
| 539547 ||  || — || April 20, 2009 || Kitt Peak || Spacewatch ||  || align=right | 3.0 km || 
|-id=548 bgcolor=#d6d6d6
| 539548 ||  || — || December 11, 2001 || Socorro || LINEAR ||  || align=right | 2.8 km || 
|-id=549 bgcolor=#E9E9E9
| 539549 ||  || — || February 3, 2000 || Kitt Peak || Spacewatch ||  || align=right | 2.1 km || 
|-id=550 bgcolor=#d6d6d6
| 539550 ||  || — || April 2, 2005 || Kitt Peak || Spacewatch ||  || align=right | 2.9 km || 
|-id=551 bgcolor=#d6d6d6
| 539551 ||  || — || April 7, 2014 || Mount Lemmon || Mount Lemmon Survey ||  || align=right | 2.8 km || 
|-id=552 bgcolor=#d6d6d6
| 539552 ||  || — || February 20, 2014 || Mount Lemmon || Mount Lemmon Survey ||  || align=right | 2.7 km || 
|-id=553 bgcolor=#E9E9E9
| 539553 ||  || — || March 14, 2010 || Mount Lemmon || Mount Lemmon Survey ||  || align=right | 2.2 km || 
|-id=554 bgcolor=#d6d6d6
| 539554 ||  || — || August 30, 2005 || Kitt Peak || Spacewatch ||  || align=right | 2.7 km || 
|-id=555 bgcolor=#E9E9E9
| 539555 ||  || — || December 1, 2008 || Mount Lemmon || Mount Lemmon Survey ||  || align=right | 1.8 km || 
|-id=556 bgcolor=#E9E9E9
| 539556 ||  || — || September 20, 2008 || Mount Lemmon || Mount Lemmon Survey ||  || align=right data-sort-value="0.77" | 770 m || 
|-id=557 bgcolor=#d6d6d6
| 539557 ||  || — || March 8, 2008 || Kitt Peak || Spacewatch ||  || align=right | 2.6 km || 
|-id=558 bgcolor=#d6d6d6
| 539558 ||  || — || March 7, 2008 || Mount Lemmon || Mount Lemmon Survey ||  || align=right | 2.6 km || 
|-id=559 bgcolor=#fefefe
| 539559 ||  || — || October 1, 2005 || Anderson Mesa || LONEOS ||  || align=right data-sort-value="0.85" | 850 m || 
|-id=560 bgcolor=#d6d6d6
| 539560 ||  || — || September 24, 2011 || Haleakala || Pan-STARRS ||  || align=right | 2.4 km || 
|-id=561 bgcolor=#fefefe
| 539561 ||  || — || June 9, 2012 || Mount Lemmon || Mount Lemmon Survey ||  || align=right data-sort-value="0.75" | 750 m || 
|-id=562 bgcolor=#d6d6d6
| 539562 ||  || — || September 26, 2005 || Kitt Peak || Spacewatch ||  || align=right | 2.7 km || 
|-id=563 bgcolor=#d6d6d6
| 539563 ||  || — || November 14, 2001 || Kitt Peak || Spacewatch ||  || align=right | 3.0 km || 
|-id=564 bgcolor=#d6d6d6
| 539564 ||  || — || December 13, 2006 || Mount Lemmon || Mount Lemmon Survey ||  || align=right | 3.2 km || 
|-id=565 bgcolor=#E9E9E9
| 539565 ||  || — || September 29, 2003 || Kitt Peak || Spacewatch ||  || align=right | 1.3 km || 
|-id=566 bgcolor=#E9E9E9
| 539566 ||  || — || February 28, 2014 || Haleakala || Pan-STARRS ||  || align=right | 1.6 km || 
|-id=567 bgcolor=#d6d6d6
| 539567 ||  || — || January 10, 2014 || Haleakala || Pan-STARRS ||  || align=right | 3.1 km || 
|-id=568 bgcolor=#d6d6d6
| 539568 ||  || — || January 2, 2013 || Mount Lemmon || Mount Lemmon Survey ||  || align=right | 3.4 km || 
|-id=569 bgcolor=#d6d6d6
| 539569 ||  || — || March 25, 2014 || Catalina || CSS ||  || align=right | 3.3 km || 
|-id=570 bgcolor=#d6d6d6
| 539570 ||  || — || April 2, 2009 || Mount Lemmon || Mount Lemmon Survey ||  || align=right | 3.2 km || 
|-id=571 bgcolor=#E9E9E9
| 539571 ||  || — || December 30, 2008 || Mount Lemmon || Mount Lemmon Survey ||  || align=right | 2.8 km || 
|-id=572 bgcolor=#d6d6d6
| 539572 ||  || — || February 8, 2013 || Kitt Peak || Spacewatch ||  || align=right | 3.0 km || 
|-id=573 bgcolor=#E9E9E9
| 539573 ||  || — || September 6, 2016 || Haleakala || Pan-STARRS ||  || align=right | 2.0 km || 
|-id=574 bgcolor=#E9E9E9
| 539574 ||  || — || October 29, 2003 || Kitt Peak || Spacewatch ||  || align=right | 2.0 km || 
|-id=575 bgcolor=#E9E9E9
| 539575 ||  || — || October 28, 2008 || Kitt Peak || Spacewatch ||  || align=right data-sort-value="0.98" | 980 m || 
|-id=576 bgcolor=#E9E9E9
| 539576 ||  || — || November 19, 2003 || Kitt Peak || Spacewatch ||  || align=right | 2.8 km || 
|-id=577 bgcolor=#d6d6d6
| 539577 ||  || — || September 24, 2011 || Haleakala || Pan-STARRS ||  || align=right | 2.6 km || 
|-id=578 bgcolor=#E9E9E9
| 539578 ||  || — || September 8, 2016 || Haleakala || Pan-STARRS ||  || align=right | 1.7 km || 
|-id=579 bgcolor=#d6d6d6
| 539579 ||  || — || March 26, 2015 || Mount Lemmon || Mount Lemmon Survey ||  || align=right | 2.3 km || 
|-id=580 bgcolor=#d6d6d6
| 539580 ||  || — || October 1, 2011 || Kitt Peak || Spacewatch ||  || align=right | 2.4 km || 
|-id=581 bgcolor=#E9E9E9
| 539581 ||  || — || July 27, 2011 || Haleakala || Pan-STARRS ||  || align=right | 1.7 km || 
|-id=582 bgcolor=#d6d6d6
| 539582 ||  || — || February 11, 2008 || Kitt Peak || Spacewatch ||  || align=right | 2.1 km || 
|-id=583 bgcolor=#d6d6d6
| 539583 ||  || — || February 20, 2014 || Mount Lemmon || Mount Lemmon Survey ||  || align=right | 2.4 km || 
|-id=584 bgcolor=#d6d6d6
| 539584 ||  || — || July 13, 2015 || Haleakala || Pan-STARRS ||  || align=right | 3.0 km || 
|-id=585 bgcolor=#d6d6d6
| 539585 ||  || — || April 29, 2010 || WISE || WISE ||  || align=right | 3.1 km || 
|-id=586 bgcolor=#E9E9E9
| 539586 ||  || — || December 31, 2013 || Haleakala || Pan-STARRS ||  || align=right | 1.3 km || 
|-id=587 bgcolor=#d6d6d6
| 539587 ||  || — || October 25, 2011 || Haleakala || Pan-STARRS ||  || align=right | 2.7 km || 
|-id=588 bgcolor=#d6d6d6
| 539588 ||  || — || April 29, 2010 || WISE || WISE ||  || align=right | 2.9 km || 
|-id=589 bgcolor=#d6d6d6
| 539589 ||  || — || January 13, 2008 || Kitt Peak || Spacewatch ||  || align=right | 4.1 km || 
|-id=590 bgcolor=#E9E9E9
| 539590 ||  || — || December 11, 2004 || Kitt Peak || Spacewatch ||  || align=right | 2.3 km || 
|-id=591 bgcolor=#fefefe
| 539591 ||  || — || August 30, 2005 || Kitt Peak || Spacewatch ||  || align=right data-sort-value="0.72" | 720 m || 
|-id=592 bgcolor=#d6d6d6
| 539592 ||  || — || November 19, 2007 || Kitt Peak || Spacewatch ||  || align=right | 2.3 km || 
|-id=593 bgcolor=#d6d6d6
| 539593 ||  || — || August 28, 2005 || Kitt Peak || Spacewatch ||  || align=right | 2.8 km || 
|-id=594 bgcolor=#E9E9E9
| 539594 ||  || — || November 14, 2012 || Kitt Peak || Spacewatch ||  || align=right | 1.1 km || 
|-id=595 bgcolor=#fefefe
| 539595 ||  || — || September 20, 2009 || Kitt Peak || Spacewatch ||  || align=right data-sort-value="0.77" | 770 m || 
|-id=596 bgcolor=#E9E9E9
| 539596 ||  || — || October 20, 2012 || Haleakala || Pan-STARRS ||  || align=right | 1.4 km || 
|-id=597 bgcolor=#d6d6d6
| 539597 ||  || — || August 16, 2010 || La Sagra || OAM Obs. ||  || align=right | 2.9 km || 
|-id=598 bgcolor=#E9E9E9
| 539598 ||  || — || February 25, 2014 || Haleakala || Pan-STARRS ||  || align=right | 2.3 km || 
|-id=599 bgcolor=#d6d6d6
| 539599 ||  || — || May 23, 2004 || Kitt Peak || Spacewatch ||  || align=right | 2.3 km || 
|-id=600 bgcolor=#d6d6d6
| 539600 ||  || — || February 12, 2008 || Mount Lemmon || Mount Lemmon Survey ||  || align=right | 2.6 km || 
|}

539601–539700 

|-bgcolor=#fefefe
| 539601 ||  || — || August 28, 2005 || Kitt Peak || Spacewatch ||  || align=right data-sort-value="0.71" | 710 m || 
|-id=602 bgcolor=#E9E9E9
| 539602 ||  || — || September 11, 2007 || Kitt Peak || Spacewatch ||  || align=right | 2.3 km || 
|-id=603 bgcolor=#d6d6d6
| 539603 ||  || — || September 6, 2008 || Mount Lemmon || Mount Lemmon Survey || 3:2 || align=right | 5.1 km || 
|-id=604 bgcolor=#E9E9E9
| 539604 ||  || — || October 10, 2007 || Mount Lemmon || Mount Lemmon Survey ||  || align=right | 2.5 km || 
|-id=605 bgcolor=#fefefe
| 539605 ||  || — || July 2, 2008 || Kitt Peak || Spacewatch ||  || align=right data-sort-value="0.67" | 670 m || 
|-id=606 bgcolor=#E9E9E9
| 539606 ||  || — || January 4, 2013 || Mount Lemmon || Mount Lemmon Survey ||  || align=right | 1.9 km || 
|-id=607 bgcolor=#d6d6d6
| 539607 ||  || — || April 20, 2009 || Kitt Peak || Spacewatch ||  || align=right | 2.6 km || 
|-id=608 bgcolor=#d6d6d6
| 539608 ||  || — || June 3, 2010 || WISE || WISE ||  || align=right | 4.9 km || 
|-id=609 bgcolor=#E9E9E9
| 539609 ||  || — || March 20, 2010 || WISE || WISE ||  || align=right | 1.1 km || 
|-id=610 bgcolor=#fefefe
| 539610 ||  || — || December 27, 2005 || Mount Lemmon || Mount Lemmon Survey ||  || align=right data-sort-value="0.70" | 700 m || 
|-id=611 bgcolor=#E9E9E9
| 539611 ||  || — || March 17, 2015 || Haleakala || Pan-STARRS ||  || align=right data-sort-value="0.94" | 940 m || 
|-id=612 bgcolor=#d6d6d6
| 539612 ||  || — || October 26, 2011 || Haleakala || Pan-STARRS ||  || align=right | 2.5 km || 
|-id=613 bgcolor=#d6d6d6
| 539613 ||  || — || April 2, 2014 || Mount Lemmon || Mount Lemmon Survey ||  || align=right | 2.3 km || 
|-id=614 bgcolor=#E9E9E9
| 539614 ||  || — || April 24, 2006 || Kitt Peak || Spacewatch ||  || align=right | 1.8 km || 
|-id=615 bgcolor=#d6d6d6
| 539615 ||  || — || October 24, 2011 || Kitt Peak || Spacewatch ||  || align=right | 2.3 km || 
|-id=616 bgcolor=#fefefe
| 539616 ||  || — || August 20, 2008 || Kitt Peak || Spacewatch ||  || align=right data-sort-value="0.71" | 710 m || 
|-id=617 bgcolor=#E9E9E9
| 539617 ||  || — || November 1, 2007 || Mount Lemmon || Mount Lemmon Survey ||  || align=right | 1.6 km || 
|-id=618 bgcolor=#fefefe
| 539618 ||  || — || August 14, 2012 || Siding Spring || SSS ||  || align=right data-sort-value="0.81" | 810 m || 
|-id=619 bgcolor=#E9E9E9
| 539619 ||  || — || January 4, 2014 || Mount Lemmon || Mount Lemmon Survey ||  || align=right | 1.2 km || 
|-id=620 bgcolor=#d6d6d6
| 539620 ||  || — || October 7, 2005 || Catalina || CSS ||  || align=right | 3.6 km || 
|-id=621 bgcolor=#d6d6d6
| 539621 ||  || — || February 28, 2008 || Mount Lemmon || Mount Lemmon Survey ||  || align=right | 2.3 km || 
|-id=622 bgcolor=#d6d6d6
| 539622 ||  || — || January 18, 2008 || Kitt Peak || Spacewatch ||  || align=right | 3.1 km || 
|-id=623 bgcolor=#d6d6d6
| 539623 ||  || — || March 11, 2014 || Mount Lemmon || Mount Lemmon Survey ||  || align=right | 3.0 km || 
|-id=624 bgcolor=#d6d6d6
| 539624 ||  || — || September 20, 2011 || Haleakala || Pan-STARRS ||  || align=right | 1.9 km || 
|-id=625 bgcolor=#d6d6d6
| 539625 ||  || — || February 22, 2007 || Kitt Peak || Spacewatch ||  || align=right | 2.5 km || 
|-id=626 bgcolor=#E9E9E9
| 539626 ||  || — || October 8, 2007 || Mount Lemmon || Mount Lemmon Survey ||  || align=right | 1.9 km || 
|-id=627 bgcolor=#E9E9E9
| 539627 ||  || — || September 30, 2016 || Haleakala || Pan-STARRS ||  || align=right | 1.3 km || 
|-id=628 bgcolor=#E9E9E9
| 539628 ||  || — || September 20, 2008 || Mount Lemmon || Mount Lemmon Survey ||  || align=right data-sort-value="0.71" | 710 m || 
|-id=629 bgcolor=#d6d6d6
| 539629 ||  || — || March 8, 2014 || Mount Lemmon || Mount Lemmon Survey ||  || align=right | 2.6 km || 
|-id=630 bgcolor=#d6d6d6
| 539630 ||  || — || March 27, 2008 || Mount Lemmon || Mount Lemmon Survey ||  || align=right | 2.7 km || 
|-id=631 bgcolor=#E9E9E9
| 539631 ||  || — || May 26, 2015 || Haleakala || Pan-STARRS ||  || align=right | 2.1 km || 
|-id=632 bgcolor=#d6d6d6
| 539632 ||  || — || September 25, 2011 || Haleakala || Pan-STARRS ||  || align=right | 2.3 km || 
|-id=633 bgcolor=#d6d6d6
| 539633 ||  || — || December 23, 2012 || Haleakala || Pan-STARRS ||  || align=right | 2.6 km || 
|-id=634 bgcolor=#d6d6d6
| 539634 ||  || — || October 18, 2011 || Kitt Peak || Spacewatch ||  || align=right | 2.4 km || 
|-id=635 bgcolor=#E9E9E9
| 539635 ||  || — || June 9, 2015 || Haleakala || Pan-STARRS ||  || align=right | 2.5 km || 
|-id=636 bgcolor=#d6d6d6
| 539636 ||  || — || May 13, 2009 || Kitt Peak || Spacewatch ||  || align=right | 3.0 km || 
|-id=637 bgcolor=#E9E9E9
| 539637 ||  || — || September 4, 2007 || Catalina || CSS ||  || align=right | 1.6 km || 
|-id=638 bgcolor=#E9E9E9
| 539638 ||  || — || October 24, 2003 || Kitt Peak || Spacewatch ||  || align=right | 1.6 km || 
|-id=639 bgcolor=#E9E9E9
| 539639 ||  || — || March 10, 2014 || Mount Lemmon || Mount Lemmon Survey ||  || align=right | 1.1 km || 
|-id=640 bgcolor=#E9E9E9
| 539640 ||  || — || October 22, 2012 || Haleakala || Pan-STARRS ||  || align=right | 1.3 km || 
|-id=641 bgcolor=#E9E9E9
| 539641 ||  || — || September 30, 2003 || Kitt Peak || Spacewatch ||  || align=right data-sort-value="0.94" | 940 m || 
|-id=642 bgcolor=#E9E9E9
| 539642 ||  || — || September 30, 2003 || Kitt Peak || Spacewatch ||  || align=right | 1.3 km || 
|-id=643 bgcolor=#d6d6d6
| 539643 ||  || — || October 26, 2011 || Haleakala || Pan-STARRS ||  || align=right | 2.2 km || 
|-id=644 bgcolor=#E9E9E9
| 539644 ||  || — || September 28, 2003 || Kitt Peak || Spacewatch ||  || align=right | 1.1 km || 
|-id=645 bgcolor=#d6d6d6
| 539645 ||  || — || September 14, 2005 || Catalina || CSS ||  || align=right | 2.8 km || 
|-id=646 bgcolor=#fefefe
| 539646 ||  || — || April 30, 2011 || Mount Lemmon || Mount Lemmon Survey ||  || align=right data-sort-value="0.82" | 820 m || 
|-id=647 bgcolor=#E9E9E9
| 539647 ||  || — || September 29, 2003 || Kitt Peak || Spacewatch ||  || align=right | 1.4 km || 
|-id=648 bgcolor=#d6d6d6
| 539648 ||  || — || January 13, 2008 || Mount Lemmon || Mount Lemmon Survey ||  || align=right | 3.5 km || 
|-id=649 bgcolor=#E9E9E9
| 539649 ||  || — || April 9, 2010 || Kitt Peak || Spacewatch ||  || align=right | 1.9 km || 
|-id=650 bgcolor=#d6d6d6
| 539650 ||  || — || April 30, 2014 || Haleakala || Pan-STARRS ||  || align=right | 2.5 km || 
|-id=651 bgcolor=#d6d6d6
| 539651 ||  || — || August 21, 2006 || Kitt Peak || Spacewatch ||  || align=right | 2.1 km || 
|-id=652 bgcolor=#E9E9E9
| 539652 ||  || — || December 19, 2009 || Mount Lemmon || Mount Lemmon Survey ||  || align=right | 1.2 km || 
|-id=653 bgcolor=#FA8072
| 539653 ||  || — || October 9, 1999 || Socorro || LINEAR ||  || align=right | 1.4 km || 
|-id=654 bgcolor=#fefefe
| 539654 ||  || — || March 13, 2005 || Kitt Peak || Spacewatch ||  || align=right data-sort-value="0.67" | 670 m || 
|-id=655 bgcolor=#d6d6d6
| 539655 ||  || — || October 22, 2006 || Catalina || CSS ||  || align=right | 3.0 km || 
|-id=656 bgcolor=#d6d6d6
| 539656 ||  || — || October 3, 2006 || Mount Lemmon || Mount Lemmon Survey ||  || align=right | 2.6 km || 
|-id=657 bgcolor=#d6d6d6
| 539657 ||  || — || March 23, 2003 || Kitt Peak || Spacewatch ||  || align=right | 2.7 km || 
|-id=658 bgcolor=#d6d6d6
| 539658 ||  || — || August 31, 2005 || Kitt Peak || Spacewatch ||  || align=right | 2.2 km || 
|-id=659 bgcolor=#E9E9E9
| 539659 ||  || — || November 7, 2012 || Kitt Peak || Spacewatch ||  || align=right | 2.3 km || 
|-id=660 bgcolor=#d6d6d6
| 539660 ||  || — || September 17, 2010 || Mount Lemmon || Mount Lemmon Survey ||  || align=right | 3.3 km || 
|-id=661 bgcolor=#d6d6d6
| 539661 ||  || — || April 25, 2010 || WISE || WISE ||  || align=right | 3.2 km || 
|-id=662 bgcolor=#d6d6d6
| 539662 ||  || — || May 18, 2010 || WISE || WISE ||  || align=right | 3.2 km || 
|-id=663 bgcolor=#d6d6d6
| 539663 ||  || — || September 30, 2006 || Mount Lemmon || Mount Lemmon Survey ||  || align=right | 3.2 km || 
|-id=664 bgcolor=#E9E9E9
| 539664 ||  || — || April 25, 2010 || WISE || WISE ||  || align=right | 3.0 km || 
|-id=665 bgcolor=#E9E9E9
| 539665 ||  || — || May 13, 2007 || Mount Lemmon || Mount Lemmon Survey ||  || align=right data-sort-value="0.97" | 970 m || 
|-id=666 bgcolor=#d6d6d6
| 539666 ||  || — || September 29, 2005 || Kitt Peak || Spacewatch ||  || align=right | 3.4 km || 
|-id=667 bgcolor=#d6d6d6
| 539667 ||  || — || September 19, 2006 || Catalina || CSS ||  || align=right | 2.1 km || 
|-id=668 bgcolor=#E9E9E9
| 539668 ||  || — || October 10, 2012 || Haleakala || Pan-STARRS ||  || align=right | 1.00 km || 
|-id=669 bgcolor=#E9E9E9
| 539669 ||  || — || October 10, 2012 || Mount Lemmon || Mount Lemmon Survey ||  || align=right data-sort-value="0.90" | 900 m || 
|-id=670 bgcolor=#d6d6d6
| 539670 ||  || — || September 27, 2011 || Mount Lemmon || Mount Lemmon Survey ||  || align=right | 2.3 km || 
|-id=671 bgcolor=#d6d6d6
| 539671 ||  || — || October 23, 2005 || Catalina || CSS ||  || align=right | 3.4 km || 
|-id=672 bgcolor=#d6d6d6
| 539672 ||  || — || August 2, 2016 || Haleakala || Pan-STARRS ||  || align=right | 2.9 km || 
|-id=673 bgcolor=#E9E9E9
| 539673 ||  || — || October 21, 2008 || Kitt Peak || Spacewatch ||  || align=right data-sort-value="0.76" | 760 m || 
|-id=674 bgcolor=#d6d6d6
| 539674 ||  || — || April 2, 2009 || Kitt Peak || Spacewatch ||  || align=right | 2.7 km || 
|-id=675 bgcolor=#d6d6d6
| 539675 ||  || — || September 4, 2011 || Haleakala || Pan-STARRS ||  || align=right | 2.0 km || 
|-id=676 bgcolor=#d6d6d6
| 539676 ||  || — || September 7, 2004 || Kitt Peak || Spacewatch ||  || align=right | 2.4 km || 
|-id=677 bgcolor=#d6d6d6
| 539677 ||  || — || November 20, 2006 || Mount Lemmon || Mount Lemmon Survey ||  || align=right | 3.2 km || 
|-id=678 bgcolor=#d6d6d6
| 539678 ||  || — || December 9, 1999 || Kitt Peak || Spacewatch ||  || align=right | 2.3 km || 
|-id=679 bgcolor=#E9E9E9
| 539679 ||  || — || April 25, 2015 || Haleakala || Pan-STARRS ||  || align=right data-sort-value="0.77" | 770 m || 
|-id=680 bgcolor=#E9E9E9
| 539680 ||  || — || October 14, 2012 || Kitt Peak || Spacewatch ||  || align=right | 1.4 km || 
|-id=681 bgcolor=#d6d6d6
| 539681 ||  || — || May 4, 2014 || Haleakala || Pan-STARRS ||  || align=right | 2.7 km || 
|-id=682 bgcolor=#d6d6d6
| 539682 ||  || — || September 4, 2000 || Kitt Peak || Spacewatch ||  || align=right | 2.7 km || 
|-id=683 bgcolor=#d6d6d6
| 539683 ||  || — || October 24, 2011 || Haleakala || Pan-STARRS ||  || align=right | 2.6 km || 
|-id=684 bgcolor=#E9E9E9
| 539684 ||  || — || January 22, 2015 || Haleakala || Pan-STARRS ||  || align=right | 1.4 km || 
|-id=685 bgcolor=#E9E9E9
| 539685 ||  || — || September 24, 2007 || Kitt Peak || Spacewatch ||  || align=right | 2.0 km || 
|-id=686 bgcolor=#d6d6d6
| 539686 ||  || — || September 18, 2006 || Kitt Peak || Spacewatch ||  || align=right | 2.4 km || 
|-id=687 bgcolor=#d6d6d6
| 539687 ||  || — || October 8, 2008 || Kitt Peak || Spacewatch || 3:2 || align=right | 4.7 km || 
|-id=688 bgcolor=#d6d6d6
| 539688 ||  || — || February 9, 2013 || Haleakala || Pan-STARRS ||  || align=right | 2.6 km || 
|-id=689 bgcolor=#d6d6d6
| 539689 ||  || — || September 30, 2006 || Mount Lemmon || Mount Lemmon Survey ||  || align=right | 2.6 km || 
|-id=690 bgcolor=#d6d6d6
| 539690 ||  || — || February 2, 2008 || Mount Lemmon || Mount Lemmon Survey ||  || align=right | 2.6 km || 
|-id=691 bgcolor=#d6d6d6
| 539691 ||  || — || November 17, 1995 || Kitt Peak || Spacewatch ||  || align=right | 3.0 km || 
|-id=692 bgcolor=#E9E9E9
| 539692 ||  || — || September 13, 2007 || Mount Lemmon || Mount Lemmon Survey ||  || align=right | 1.5 km || 
|-id=693 bgcolor=#d6d6d6
| 539693 ||  || — || March 13, 2008 || Kitt Peak || Spacewatch ||  || align=right | 2.9 km || 
|-id=694 bgcolor=#FFC2E0
| 539694 ||  || — || October 13, 2016 || Mount Lemmon || Mount Lemmon Survey || APOcritical || align=right data-sort-value="0.20" | 200 m || 
|-id=695 bgcolor=#d6d6d6
| 539695 ||  || — || February 18, 2004 || Kitt Peak || Spacewatch ||  || align=right | 2.6 km || 
|-id=696 bgcolor=#d6d6d6
| 539696 ||  || — || October 22, 2006 || Catalina || CSS ||  || align=right | 3.1 km || 
|-id=697 bgcolor=#d6d6d6
| 539697 ||  || — || July 2, 2005 || Kitt Peak || Spacewatch ||  || align=right | 2.9 km || 
|-id=698 bgcolor=#d6d6d6
| 539698 ||  || — || December 2, 2010 || Mount Lemmon || Mount Lemmon Survey || 7:4 || align=right | 2.9 km || 
|-id=699 bgcolor=#d6d6d6
| 539699 ||  || — || February 1, 2013 || Kitt Peak || Spacewatch ||  || align=right | 3.0 km || 
|-id=700 bgcolor=#d6d6d6
| 539700 ||  || — || February 19, 2002 || Kitt Peak || Spacewatch ||  || align=right | 3.0 km || 
|}

539701–539800 

|-bgcolor=#d6d6d6
| 539701 ||  || — || June 26, 2010 || WISE || WISE ||  || align=right | 2.9 km || 
|-id=702 bgcolor=#d6d6d6
| 539702 ||  || — || November 19, 2006 || Kitt Peak || Spacewatch ||  || align=right | 2.2 km || 
|-id=703 bgcolor=#d6d6d6
| 539703 ||  || — || October 7, 2005 || Kitt Peak || Spacewatch ||  || align=right | 2.0 km || 
|-id=704 bgcolor=#d6d6d6
| 539704 ||  || — || June 18, 2015 || Haleakala || Pan-STARRS ||  || align=right | 2.4 km || 
|-id=705 bgcolor=#E9E9E9
| 539705 ||  || — || October 7, 2016 || Haleakala || Pan-STARRS ||  || align=right | 1.9 km || 
|-id=706 bgcolor=#d6d6d6
| 539706 ||  || — || October 24, 2011 || Haleakala || Pan-STARRS ||  || align=right | 2.7 km || 
|-id=707 bgcolor=#d6d6d6
| 539707 ||  || — || March 12, 2014 || Haleakala || Pan-STARRS ||  || align=right | 3.3 km || 
|-id=708 bgcolor=#d6d6d6
| 539708 ||  || — || February 29, 2008 || Kitt Peak || Spacewatch ||  || align=right | 3.2 km || 
|-id=709 bgcolor=#d6d6d6
| 539709 ||  || — || October 23, 2006 || Kitt Peak || Spacewatch ||  || align=right | 2.2 km || 
|-id=710 bgcolor=#E9E9E9
| 539710 ||  || — || December 11, 2012 || Mount Lemmon || Mount Lemmon Survey ||  || align=right | 1.1 km || 
|-id=711 bgcolor=#E9E9E9
| 539711 ||  || — || September 14, 2007 || Mount Lemmon || Mount Lemmon Survey ||  || align=right | 2.0 km || 
|-id=712 bgcolor=#E9E9E9
| 539712 ||  || — || September 20, 2011 || Haleakala || Pan-STARRS ||  || align=right | 2.1 km || 
|-id=713 bgcolor=#d6d6d6
| 539713 ||  || — || October 9, 2005 || Kitt Peak || Spacewatch ||  || align=right | 2.3 km || 
|-id=714 bgcolor=#d6d6d6
| 539714 ||  || — || August 10, 2016 || Haleakala || Pan-STARRS ||  || align=right | 2.5 km || 
|-id=715 bgcolor=#d6d6d6
| 539715 ||  || — || September 27, 2016 || Mount Lemmon || Mount Lemmon Survey ||  || align=right | 1.9 km || 
|-id=716 bgcolor=#d6d6d6
| 539716 ||  || — || April 25, 2008 || Mount Lemmon || Mount Lemmon Survey ||  || align=right | 3.3 km || 
|-id=717 bgcolor=#E9E9E9
| 539717 ||  || — || July 16, 1998 || Kitt Peak || Spacewatch ||  || align=right | 1.2 km || 
|-id=718 bgcolor=#E9E9E9
| 539718 ||  || — || October 29, 2008 || Kitt Peak || Spacewatch ||  || align=right data-sort-value="0.91" | 910 m || 
|-id=719 bgcolor=#d6d6d6
| 539719 ||  || — || July 14, 2010 || WISE || WISE ||  || align=right | 2.5 km || 
|-id=720 bgcolor=#d6d6d6
| 539720 ||  || — || October 10, 2016 || Mount Lemmon || Mount Lemmon Survey ||  || align=right | 2.2 km || 
|-id=721 bgcolor=#E9E9E9
| 539721 ||  || — || November 5, 2012 || Kitt Peak || Spacewatch ||  || align=right data-sort-value="0.99" | 990 m || 
|-id=722 bgcolor=#fefefe
| 539722 ||  || — || August 28, 2005 || Kitt Peak || Spacewatch ||  || align=right data-sort-value="0.90" | 900 m || 
|-id=723 bgcolor=#E9E9E9
| 539723 ||  || — || November 3, 2012 || Haleakala || Pan-STARRS ||  || align=right | 1.6 km || 
|-id=724 bgcolor=#E9E9E9
| 539724 ||  || — || May 22, 2015 || Haleakala || Pan-STARRS ||  || align=right | 1.6 km || 
|-id=725 bgcolor=#d6d6d6
| 539725 ||  || — || June 8, 2010 || WISE || WISE ||  || align=right | 3.8 km || 
|-id=726 bgcolor=#d6d6d6
| 539726 ||  || — || October 20, 2011 || Mount Lemmon || Mount Lemmon Survey ||  || align=right | 2.8 km || 
|-id=727 bgcolor=#d6d6d6
| 539727 ||  || — || June 17, 2015 || Haleakala || Pan-STARRS ||  || align=right | 2.5 km || 
|-id=728 bgcolor=#E9E9E9
| 539728 ||  || — || June 18, 2007 || Kitt Peak || Spacewatch ||  || align=right data-sort-value="0.95" | 950 m || 
|-id=729 bgcolor=#d6d6d6
| 539729 ||  || — || October 27, 2005 || Mount Lemmon || Mount Lemmon Survey ||  || align=right | 2.1 km || 
|-id=730 bgcolor=#d6d6d6
| 539730 ||  || — || May 14, 2008 || Mount Lemmon || Mount Lemmon Survey ||  || align=right | 3.4 km || 
|-id=731 bgcolor=#E9E9E9
| 539731 ||  || — || September 2, 2007 || Mount Lemmon || Mount Lemmon Survey ||  || align=right | 1.5 km || 
|-id=732 bgcolor=#d6d6d6
| 539732 ||  || — || December 22, 2012 || Haleakala || Pan-STARRS ||  || align=right | 2.6 km || 
|-id=733 bgcolor=#d6d6d6
| 539733 ||  || — || August 31, 2005 || Kitt Peak || Spacewatch ||  || align=right | 3.2 km || 
|-id=734 bgcolor=#d6d6d6
| 539734 ||  || — || November 3, 2005 || Catalina || CSS ||  || align=right | 2.5 km || 
|-id=735 bgcolor=#d6d6d6
| 539735 ||  || — || May 27, 2010 || WISE || WISE ||  || align=right | 3.3 km || 
|-id=736 bgcolor=#E9E9E9
| 539736 ||  || — || May 20, 2015 || Mount Lemmon || Mount Lemmon Survey ||  || align=right data-sort-value="0.91" | 910 m || 
|-id=737 bgcolor=#d6d6d6
| 539737 ||  || — || August 18, 2006 || Kitt Peak || Spacewatch ||  || align=right | 2.2 km || 
|-id=738 bgcolor=#fefefe
| 539738 ||  || — || September 14, 2005 || Kitt Peak || Spacewatch ||  || align=right data-sort-value="0.77" | 770 m || 
|-id=739 bgcolor=#fefefe
| 539739 ||  || — || September 26, 2009 || Kitt Peak || Spacewatch ||  || align=right data-sort-value="0.90" | 900 m || 
|-id=740 bgcolor=#d6d6d6
| 539740 ||  || — || October 25, 2005 || Kitt Peak || Spacewatch ||  || align=right | 2.9 km || 
|-id=741 bgcolor=#E9E9E9
| 539741 ||  || — || June 17, 2015 || Haleakala || Pan-STARRS ||  || align=right | 1.9 km || 
|-id=742 bgcolor=#d6d6d6
| 539742 ||  || — || May 12, 2010 || WISE || WISE ||  || align=right | 1.7 km || 
|-id=743 bgcolor=#d6d6d6
| 539743 ||  || — || October 18, 2011 || Mount Lemmon || Mount Lemmon Survey ||  || align=right | 2.6 km || 
|-id=744 bgcolor=#d6d6d6
| 539744 ||  || — || September 19, 2006 || Kitt Peak || Spacewatch ||  || align=right | 1.7 km || 
|-id=745 bgcolor=#E9E9E9
| 539745 ||  || — || March 26, 2006 || Mount Lemmon || Mount Lemmon Survey ||  || align=right | 1.5 km || 
|-id=746 bgcolor=#d6d6d6
| 539746 ||  || — || October 10, 2004 || Kitt Peak || Spacewatch ||  || align=right | 3.3 km || 
|-id=747 bgcolor=#d6d6d6
| 539747 ||  || — || October 25, 2005 || Kitt Peak || Spacewatch ||  || align=right | 2.8 km || 
|-id=748 bgcolor=#d6d6d6
| 539748 ||  || — || October 1, 2011 || Kitt Peak || Spacewatch ||  || align=right | 2.4 km || 
|-id=749 bgcolor=#d6d6d6
| 539749 ||  || — || October 11, 2010 || Kitt Peak || Spacewatch ||  || align=right | 2.6 km || 
|-id=750 bgcolor=#fefefe
| 539750 ||  || — || December 21, 2006 || Kitt Peak || Spacewatch ||  || align=right data-sort-value="0.73" | 730 m || 
|-id=751 bgcolor=#E9E9E9
| 539751 ||  || — || September 19, 2003 || Kitt Peak || Spacewatch ||  || align=right | 1.3 km || 
|-id=752 bgcolor=#d6d6d6
| 539752 ||  || — || October 6, 2005 || Mount Lemmon || Mount Lemmon Survey ||  || align=right | 2.0 km || 
|-id=753 bgcolor=#E9E9E9
| 539753 ||  || — || March 30, 2015 || Haleakala || Pan-STARRS ||  || align=right data-sort-value="0.89" | 890 m || 
|-id=754 bgcolor=#d6d6d6
| 539754 ||  || — || September 26, 2006 || Kitt Peak || Spacewatch ||  || align=right | 1.9 km || 
|-id=755 bgcolor=#d6d6d6
| 539755 ||  || — || September 23, 2011 || Haleakala || Pan-STARRS ||  || align=right | 2.2 km || 
|-id=756 bgcolor=#E9E9E9
| 539756 ||  || — || October 22, 2012 || Haleakala || Pan-STARRS ||  || align=right | 1.7 km || 
|-id=757 bgcolor=#E9E9E9
| 539757 ||  || — || November 4, 2007 || Kitt Peak || Spacewatch ||  || align=right | 1.7 km || 
|-id=758 bgcolor=#E9E9E9
| 539758 ||  || — || April 11, 2005 || Kitt Peak || Spacewatch || MRX || align=right data-sort-value="0.99" | 990 m || 
|-id=759 bgcolor=#d6d6d6
| 539759 ||  || — || April 1, 2010 || WISE || WISE || SHU3:2 || align=right | 3.1 km || 
|-id=760 bgcolor=#d6d6d6
| 539760 ||  || — || October 25, 2005 || Kitt Peak || Spacewatch ||  || align=right | 2.6 km || 
|-id=761 bgcolor=#E9E9E9
| 539761 ||  || — || May 8, 2006 || Mount Lemmon || Mount Lemmon Survey ||  || align=right | 1.5 km || 
|-id=762 bgcolor=#d6d6d6
| 539762 ||  || — || February 12, 2008 || Mount Lemmon || Mount Lemmon Survey ||  || align=right | 2.7 km || 
|-id=763 bgcolor=#E9E9E9
| 539763 ||  || — || October 4, 2007 || Kitt Peak || Spacewatch ||  || align=right | 2.1 km || 
|-id=764 bgcolor=#fefefe
| 539764 ||  || — || May 28, 2008 || Mount Lemmon || Mount Lemmon Survey ||  || align=right data-sort-value="0.83" | 830 m || 
|-id=765 bgcolor=#E9E9E9
| 539765 ||  || — || November 26, 2003 || Kitt Peak || Spacewatch ||  || align=right | 1.7 km || 
|-id=766 bgcolor=#d6d6d6
| 539766 ||  || — || October 26, 2005 || Kitt Peak || Spacewatch ||  || align=right | 2.8 km || 
|-id=767 bgcolor=#d6d6d6
| 539767 ||  || — || October 3, 2006 || Mount Lemmon || Mount Lemmon Survey ||  || align=right | 1.9 km || 
|-id=768 bgcolor=#E9E9E9
| 539768 ||  || — || May 6, 2006 || Mount Lemmon || Mount Lemmon Survey ||  || align=right | 1.8 km || 
|-id=769 bgcolor=#d6d6d6
| 539769 ||  || — || November 17, 2011 || Kitt Peak || Spacewatch ||  || align=right | 2.7 km || 
|-id=770 bgcolor=#d6d6d6
| 539770 ||  || — || October 13, 2010 || Kitt Peak || Spacewatch ||  || align=right | 2.5 km || 
|-id=771 bgcolor=#E9E9E9
| 539771 ||  || — || September 15, 2007 || Mount Lemmon || Mount Lemmon Survey ||  || align=right | 1.8 km || 
|-id=772 bgcolor=#d6d6d6
| 539772 ||  || — || November 2, 2005 || Mount Lemmon || Mount Lemmon Survey ||  || align=right | 3.3 km || 
|-id=773 bgcolor=#fefefe
| 539773 ||  || — || November 1, 2005 || Mount Lemmon || Mount Lemmon Survey ||  || align=right | 1.4 km || 
|-id=774 bgcolor=#E9E9E9
| 539774 ||  || — || February 27, 2014 || Haleakala || Pan-STARRS ||  || align=right | 1.5 km || 
|-id=775 bgcolor=#d6d6d6
| 539775 ||  || — || April 17, 2009 || Kitt Peak || Spacewatch ||  || align=right | 2.8 km || 
|-id=776 bgcolor=#d6d6d6
| 539776 ||  || — || October 11, 2005 || Kitt Peak || Spacewatch ||  || align=right | 2.3 km || 
|-id=777 bgcolor=#E9E9E9
| 539777 ||  || — || May 21, 2015 || Haleakala || Pan-STARRS ||  || align=right | 1.2 km || 
|-id=778 bgcolor=#d6d6d6
| 539778 ||  || — || June 4, 2014 || Haleakala || Pan-STARRS ||  || align=right | 2.9 km || 
|-id=779 bgcolor=#E9E9E9
| 539779 ||  || — || April 8, 2010 || Kitt Peak || Spacewatch ||  || align=right | 2.4 km || 
|-id=780 bgcolor=#d6d6d6
| 539780 ||  || — || August 13, 2010 || Kitt Peak || Spacewatch ||  || align=right | 2.7 km || 
|-id=781 bgcolor=#E9E9E9
| 539781 ||  || — || April 2, 2011 || Haleakala || Pan-STARRS ||  || align=right | 1.1 km || 
|-id=782 bgcolor=#d6d6d6
| 539782 ||  || — || July 21, 2010 || WISE || WISE ||  || align=right | 2.9 km || 
|-id=783 bgcolor=#d6d6d6
| 539783 ||  || — || December 29, 2011 || Mount Lemmon || Mount Lemmon Survey ||  || align=right | 2.5 km || 
|-id=784 bgcolor=#d6d6d6
| 539784 ||  || — || July 9, 2010 || WISE || WISE ||  || align=right | 2.6 km || 
|-id=785 bgcolor=#d6d6d6
| 539785 ||  || — || June 26, 2010 || WISE || WISE ||  || align=right | 2.7 km || 
|-id=786 bgcolor=#d6d6d6
| 539786 ||  || — || November 1, 2011 || Kitt Peak || Spacewatch ||  || align=right | 2.6 km || 
|-id=787 bgcolor=#E9E9E9
| 539787 ||  || — || October 18, 2011 || Catalina || CSS ||  || align=right | 2.4 km || 
|-id=788 bgcolor=#d6d6d6
| 539788 ||  || — || April 26, 2008 || Kitt Peak || Spacewatch ||  || align=right | 3.9 km || 
|-id=789 bgcolor=#fefefe
| 539789 ||  || — || July 4, 2013 || Haleakala || Pan-STARRS || H || align=right data-sort-value="0.67" | 670 m || 
|-id=790 bgcolor=#d6d6d6
| 539790 ||  || — || May 28, 2014 || Haleakala || Pan-STARRS ||  || align=right | 4.7 km || 
|-id=791 bgcolor=#d6d6d6
| 539791 ||  || — || July 24, 2010 || WISE || WISE ||  || align=right | 3.4 km || 
|-id=792 bgcolor=#fefefe
| 539792 ||  || — || January 7, 2010 || Kitt Peak || Spacewatch ||  || align=right data-sort-value="0.91" | 910 m || 
|-id=793 bgcolor=#fefefe
| 539793 ||  || — || March 25, 2014 || Haleakala || Pan-STARRS ||  || align=right data-sort-value="0.74" | 740 m || 
|-id=794 bgcolor=#fefefe
| 539794 ||  || — || April 25, 2015 || Haleakala || Pan-STARRS || H || align=right data-sort-value="0.53" | 530 m || 
|-id=795 bgcolor=#fefefe
| 539795 ||  || — || January 15, 2001 || Kitt Peak || Spacewatch || H || align=right data-sort-value="0.69" | 690 m || 
|-id=796 bgcolor=#C2FFFF
| 539796 ||  || — || July 25, 2011 || Haleakala || Pan-STARRS || L5 || align=right | 12 km || 
|-id=797 bgcolor=#d6d6d6
| 539797 ||  || — || February 24, 2012 || Mount Lemmon || Mount Lemmon Survey ||  || align=right | 2.4 km || 
|-id=798 bgcolor=#fefefe
| 539798 ||  || — || March 14, 2007 || Mount Lemmon || Mount Lemmon Survey || H || align=right data-sort-value="0.56" | 560 m || 
|-id=799 bgcolor=#fefefe
| 539799 ||  || — || March 6, 2013 || Haleakala || Pan-STARRS ||  || align=right data-sort-value="0.98" | 980 m || 
|-id=800 bgcolor=#fefefe
| 539800 ||  || — || July 2, 2005 || Kitt Peak || Spacewatch || H || align=right data-sort-value="0.52" | 520 m || 
|}

539801–539900 

|-bgcolor=#fefefe
| 539801 ||  || — || June 8, 2005 || Kitt Peak || Spacewatch || H || align=right data-sort-value="0.51" | 510 m || 
|-id=802 bgcolor=#FA8072
| 539802 ||  || — || January 4, 2017 || Haleakala || Pan-STARRS || H || align=right data-sort-value="0.54" | 540 m || 
|-id=803 bgcolor=#C2FFFF
| 539803 ||  || — || August 24, 2011 || Haleakala || Pan-STARRS || L5 || align=right | 10 km || 
|-id=804 bgcolor=#fefefe
| 539804 ||  || — || February 20, 2006 || Mount Lemmon || Mount Lemmon Survey ||  || align=right | 1.2 km || 
|-id=805 bgcolor=#FA8072
| 539805 ||  || — || October 30, 2008 || Kitt Peak || Spacewatch || H || align=right data-sort-value="0.48" | 480 m || 
|-id=806 bgcolor=#E9E9E9
| 539806 ||  || — || October 3, 2006 || Mount Lemmon || Mount Lemmon Survey ||  || align=right | 2.0 km || 
|-id=807 bgcolor=#fefefe
| 539807 ||  || — || December 1, 2008 || Kitt Peak || Spacewatch ||  || align=right data-sort-value="0.73" | 730 m || 
|-id=808 bgcolor=#fefefe
| 539808 ||  || — || January 27, 2017 || Mount Lemmon || Mount Lemmon Survey || H || align=right data-sort-value="0.57" | 570 m || 
|-id=809 bgcolor=#fefefe
| 539809 ||  || — || November 1, 2005 || Kitt Peak || Spacewatch ||  || align=right data-sort-value="0.67" | 670 m || 
|-id=810 bgcolor=#fefefe
| 539810 ||  || — || November 19, 2008 || Mount Lemmon || Mount Lemmon Survey ||  || align=right data-sort-value="0.98" | 980 m || 
|-id=811 bgcolor=#d6d6d6
| 539811 ||  || — || July 30, 2008 || Mount Lemmon || Mount Lemmon Survey ||  || align=right | 3.9 km || 
|-id=812 bgcolor=#fefefe
| 539812 ||  || — || April 5, 2003 || Kitt Peak || Spacewatch ||  || align=right | 1.1 km || 
|-id=813 bgcolor=#d6d6d6
| 539813 ||  || — || February 8, 2007 || Kitt Peak || Spacewatch ||  || align=right | 2.8 km || 
|-id=814 bgcolor=#fefefe
| 539814 ||  || — || September 2, 2008 || Kitt Peak || Spacewatch ||  || align=right data-sort-value="0.80" | 800 m || 
|-id=815 bgcolor=#C2FFFF
| 539815 ||  || — || March 23, 2010 || WISE || WISE || L5 || align=right | 10 km || 
|-id=816 bgcolor=#fefefe
| 539816 ||  || — || November 21, 2009 || Mount Lemmon || Mount Lemmon Survey ||  || align=right data-sort-value="0.71" | 710 m || 
|-id=817 bgcolor=#fefefe
| 539817 ||  || — || February 21, 2006 || Catalina || CSS ||  || align=right | 1.1 km || 
|-id=818 bgcolor=#fefefe
| 539818 ||  || — || February 13, 2009 || Kitt Peak || Spacewatch || H || align=right data-sort-value="0.53" | 530 m || 
|-id=819 bgcolor=#fefefe
| 539819 ||  || — || March 13, 2012 || Catalina || CSS || H || align=right data-sort-value="0.56" | 560 m || 
|-id=820 bgcolor=#fefefe
| 539820 ||  || — || April 25, 2006 || Mount Lemmon || Mount Lemmon Survey || H || align=right data-sort-value="0.76" | 760 m || 
|-id=821 bgcolor=#E9E9E9
| 539821 ||  || — || September 2, 2010 || Mount Lemmon || Mount Lemmon Survey ||  || align=right | 1.8 km || 
|-id=822 bgcolor=#E9E9E9
| 539822 ||  || — || October 22, 1998 || Kitt Peak || Spacewatch ||  || align=right | 1.4 km || 
|-id=823 bgcolor=#fefefe
| 539823 ||  || — || September 4, 2011 || Haleakala || Pan-STARRS ||  || align=right data-sort-value="0.74" | 740 m || 
|-id=824 bgcolor=#d6d6d6
| 539824 ||  || — || December 24, 2005 || Kitt Peak || Spacewatch ||  || align=right | 3.1 km || 
|-id=825 bgcolor=#fefefe
| 539825 ||  || — || February 20, 2009 || Kitt Peak || Spacewatch || H || align=right data-sort-value="0.51" | 510 m || 
|-id=826 bgcolor=#fefefe
| 539826 ||  || — || July 5, 2010 || Kitt Peak || Spacewatch || H || align=right data-sort-value="0.75" | 750 m || 
|-id=827 bgcolor=#fefefe
| 539827 ||  || — || March 15, 2012 || Mount Lemmon || Mount Lemmon Survey || H || align=right data-sort-value="0.50" | 500 m || 
|-id=828 bgcolor=#C2FFFF
| 539828 ||  || — || January 31, 2006 || Kitt Peak || Spacewatch || L5 || align=right | 7.7 km || 
|-id=829 bgcolor=#C2FFFF
| 539829 ||  || — || July 26, 2011 || Haleakala || Pan-STARRS || L5 || align=right | 8.6 km || 
|-id=830 bgcolor=#C2FFFF
| 539830 ||  || — || March 1, 2005 || Kitt Peak || Spacewatch || L5 || align=right | 9.9 km || 
|-id=831 bgcolor=#d6d6d6
| 539831 ||  || — || April 25, 2007 || Kitt Peak || Spacewatch ||  || align=right | 4.2 km || 
|-id=832 bgcolor=#fefefe
| 539832 ||  || — || August 3, 2015 || Haleakala || Pan-STARRS || H || align=right data-sort-value="0.67" | 670 m || 
|-id=833 bgcolor=#fefefe
| 539833 ||  || — || August 10, 2010 || Kitt Peak || Spacewatch || H || align=right data-sort-value="0.53" | 530 m || 
|-id=834 bgcolor=#fefefe
| 539834 ||  || — || December 29, 2005 || Mount Lemmon || Mount Lemmon Survey ||  || align=right data-sort-value="0.99" | 990 m || 
|-id=835 bgcolor=#fefefe
| 539835 ||  || — || September 2, 2010 || La Sagra || OAM Obs. || H || align=right data-sort-value="0.71" | 710 m || 
|-id=836 bgcolor=#fefefe
| 539836 ||  || — || February 23, 2009 || La Sagra || OAM Obs. || H || align=right data-sort-value="0.81" | 810 m || 
|-id=837 bgcolor=#d6d6d6
| 539837 ||  || — || December 1, 2010 || Mount Lemmon || Mount Lemmon Survey ||  || align=right | 3.3 km || 
|-id=838 bgcolor=#fefefe
| 539838 ||  || — || February 19, 2009 || La Sagra || OAM Obs. || H || align=right data-sort-value="0.71" | 710 m || 
|-id=839 bgcolor=#fefefe
| 539839 ||  || — || December 27, 2006 || Mount Lemmon || Mount Lemmon Survey ||  || align=right data-sort-value="0.71" | 710 m || 
|-id=840 bgcolor=#E9E9E9
| 539840 ||  || — || December 4, 1996 || Kitt Peak || Spacewatch ||  || align=right | 3.4 km || 
|-id=841 bgcolor=#fefefe
| 539841 ||  || — || March 19, 2009 || Kitt Peak || Spacewatch || H || align=right data-sort-value="0.80" | 800 m || 
|-id=842 bgcolor=#E9E9E9
| 539842 ||  || — || February 14, 2008 || Catalina || CSS ||  || align=right | 2.6 km || 
|-id=843 bgcolor=#d6d6d6
| 539843 ||  || — || January 31, 2010 || WISE || WISE ||  || align=right | 4.1 km || 
|-id=844 bgcolor=#d6d6d6
| 539844 ||  || — || October 9, 2010 || Mount Lemmon || Mount Lemmon Survey ||  || align=right | 3.2 km || 
|-id=845 bgcolor=#fefefe
| 539845 ||  || — || September 30, 2007 || Kitt Peak || Spacewatch || H || align=right data-sort-value="0.61" | 610 m || 
|-id=846 bgcolor=#fefefe
| 539846 ||  || — || February 26, 2010 || WISE || WISE ||  || align=right | 1.7 km || 
|-id=847 bgcolor=#fefefe
| 539847 ||  || — || November 21, 2006 || Mount Lemmon || Mount Lemmon Survey ||  || align=right | 1.0 km || 
|-id=848 bgcolor=#fefefe
| 539848 ||  || — || July 28, 2011 || Haleakala || Pan-STARRS ||  || align=right | 1.3 km || 
|-id=849 bgcolor=#E9E9E9
| 539849 ||  || — || November 5, 2007 || Kitt Peak || Spacewatch ||  || align=right | 1.8 km || 
|-id=850 bgcolor=#d6d6d6
| 539850 ||  || — || January 28, 2006 || Catalina || CSS ||  || align=right | 3.3 km || 
|-id=851 bgcolor=#fefefe
| 539851 ||  || — || January 3, 2017 || Haleakala || Pan-STARRS ||  || align=right | 1.1 km || 
|-id=852 bgcolor=#d6d6d6
| 539852 ||  || — || October 9, 2013 || Mount Lemmon || Mount Lemmon Survey ||  || align=right | 2.7 km || 
|-id=853 bgcolor=#FA8072
| 539853 ||  || — || December 8, 2005 || Catalina || CSS || H || align=right data-sort-value="0.75" | 750 m || 
|-id=854 bgcolor=#fefefe
| 539854 ||  || — || October 25, 2000 || Kitt Peak || Spacewatch || H || align=right data-sort-value="0.72" | 720 m || 
|-id=855 bgcolor=#fefefe
| 539855 ||  || — || March 25, 2007 || Mount Lemmon || Mount Lemmon Survey || H || align=right data-sort-value="0.63" | 630 m || 
|-id=856 bgcolor=#FFC2E0
| 539856 ||  || — || March 5, 2017 || Haleakala || Pan-STARRS || APO || align=right data-sort-value="0.22" | 220 m || 
|-id=857 bgcolor=#FA8072
| 539857 ||  || — || December 21, 2005 || Socorro || LINEAR || H || align=right data-sort-value="0.73" | 730 m || 
|-id=858 bgcolor=#fefefe
| 539858 ||  || — || January 24, 2006 || Mount Lemmon || Mount Lemmon Survey || H || align=right data-sort-value="0.70" | 700 m || 
|-id=859 bgcolor=#fefefe
| 539859 ||  || — || December 2, 2005 || Mount Lemmon || Mount Lemmon Survey || H || align=right data-sort-value="0.55" | 550 m || 
|-id=860 bgcolor=#fefefe
| 539860 ||  || — || March 2, 2009 || Mount Lemmon || Mount Lemmon Survey || H || align=right data-sort-value="0.68" | 680 m || 
|-id=861 bgcolor=#fefefe
| 539861 ||  || — || August 21, 2004 || Siding Spring || SSS ||  || align=right data-sort-value="0.81" | 810 m || 
|-id=862 bgcolor=#fefefe
| 539862 ||  || — || July 9, 2011 || Haleakala || Pan-STARRS ||  || align=right data-sort-value="0.84" | 840 m || 
|-id=863 bgcolor=#E9E9E9
| 539863 ||  || — || June 18, 2013 || Haleakala || Pan-STARRS ||  || align=right | 1.6 km || 
|-id=864 bgcolor=#fefefe
| 539864 ||  || — || December 7, 2013 || Haleakala || Pan-STARRS || H || align=right data-sort-value="0.57" | 570 m || 
|-id=865 bgcolor=#fefefe
| 539865 ||  || — || October 28, 2005 || Mount Lemmon || Mount Lemmon Survey || H || align=right data-sort-value="0.94" | 940 m || 
|-id=866 bgcolor=#fefefe
| 539866 ||  || — || November 26, 2010 || Mount Lemmon || Mount Lemmon Survey || H || align=right data-sort-value="0.77" | 770 m || 
|-id=867 bgcolor=#FA8072
| 539867 ||  || — || August 26, 2000 || Socorro || LINEAR || H || align=right data-sort-value="0.90" | 900 m || 
|-id=868 bgcolor=#FA8072
| 539868 ||  || — || September 12, 2013 || Catalina || CSS || H || align=right data-sort-value="0.43" | 430 m || 
|-id=869 bgcolor=#fefefe
| 539869 ||  || — || November 8, 2013 || Mount Lemmon || Mount Lemmon Survey || H || align=right data-sort-value="0.76" | 760 m || 
|-id=870 bgcolor=#fefefe
| 539870 ||  || — || October 8, 2004 || Kitt Peak || Spacewatch || H || align=right data-sort-value="0.55" | 550 m || 
|-id=871 bgcolor=#fefefe
| 539871 ||  || — || July 23, 2015 || Haleakala || Pan-STARRS || H || align=right data-sort-value="0.59" | 590 m || 
|-id=872 bgcolor=#fefefe
| 539872 ||  || — || February 24, 2006 || Kitt Peak || Spacewatch || H || align=right data-sort-value="0.67" | 670 m || 
|-id=873 bgcolor=#fefefe
| 539873 ||  || — || May 22, 2011 || Mount Lemmon || Mount Lemmon Survey ||  || align=right data-sort-value="0.67" | 670 m || 
|-id=874 bgcolor=#fefefe
| 539874 ||  || — || August 25, 2011 || La Sagra || OAM Obs. ||  || align=right data-sort-value="0.81" | 810 m || 
|-id=875 bgcolor=#fefefe
| 539875 ||  || — || May 7, 2006 || Mount Lemmon || Mount Lemmon Survey ||  || align=right data-sort-value="0.91" | 910 m || 
|-id=876 bgcolor=#fefefe
| 539876 ||  || — || April 30, 2006 || Kitt Peak || Spacewatch ||  || align=right data-sort-value="0.93" | 930 m || 
|-id=877 bgcolor=#fefefe
| 539877 ||  || — || October 7, 2004 || Kitt Peak || Spacewatch ||  || align=right data-sort-value="0.71" | 710 m || 
|-id=878 bgcolor=#fefefe
| 539878 ||  || — || August 9, 2015 || Haleakala || Pan-STARRS || H || align=right data-sort-value="0.72" | 720 m || 
|-id=879 bgcolor=#fefefe
| 539879 ||  || — || September 21, 2008 || Kitt Peak || Spacewatch ||  || align=right data-sort-value="0.66" | 660 m || 
|-id=880 bgcolor=#d6d6d6
| 539880 ||  || — || January 22, 2006 || Mount Lemmon || Mount Lemmon Survey ||  || align=right | 2.4 km || 
|-id=881 bgcolor=#d6d6d6
| 539881 ||  || — || January 23, 2006 || Kitt Peak || Spacewatch ||  || align=right | 3.2 km || 
|-id=882 bgcolor=#fefefe
| 539882 ||  || — || May 5, 2014 || Mount Lemmon || Mount Lemmon Survey ||  || align=right data-sort-value="0.56" | 560 m || 
|-id=883 bgcolor=#E9E9E9
| 539883 ||  || — || April 24, 2000 || Kitt Peak || Spacewatch ||  || align=right | 1.8 km || 
|-id=884 bgcolor=#fefefe
| 539884 ||  || — || March 26, 2003 || Kitt Peak || Spacewatch ||  || align=right data-sort-value="0.98" | 980 m || 
|-id=885 bgcolor=#fefefe
| 539885 ||  || — || October 25, 2008 || Kitt Peak || Spacewatch ||  || align=right data-sort-value="0.86" | 860 m || 
|-id=886 bgcolor=#fefefe
| 539886 ||  || — || August 8, 2007 || Socorro || LINEAR ||  || align=right data-sort-value="0.81" | 810 m || 
|-id=887 bgcolor=#fefefe
| 539887 ||  || — || May 7, 2014 || Haleakala || Pan-STARRS ||  || align=right data-sort-value="0.77" | 770 m || 
|-id=888 bgcolor=#fefefe
| 539888 ||  || — || June 6, 2014 || Haleakala || Pan-STARRS ||  || align=right data-sort-value="0.78" | 780 m || 
|-id=889 bgcolor=#fefefe
| 539889 ||  || — || October 12, 2005 || Kitt Peak || Spacewatch ||  || align=right data-sort-value="0.69" | 690 m || 
|-id=890 bgcolor=#fefefe
| 539890 ||  || — || September 25, 2005 || Kitt Peak || Spacewatch || H || align=right data-sort-value="0.65" | 650 m || 
|-id=891 bgcolor=#fefefe
| 539891 ||  || — || June 17, 2010 || WISE || WISE ||  || align=right | 2.1 km || 
|-id=892 bgcolor=#fefefe
| 539892 ||  || — || September 14, 2005 || Kitt Peak || Spacewatch ||  || align=right data-sort-value="0.69" | 690 m || 
|-id=893 bgcolor=#fefefe
| 539893 ||  || — || November 23, 2011 || Mount Lemmon || Mount Lemmon Survey ||  || align=right data-sort-value="0.86" | 860 m || 
|-id=894 bgcolor=#E9E9E9
| 539894 ||  || — || December 20, 2001 || Kitt Peak || Spacewatch ||  || align=right | 2.6 km || 
|-id=895 bgcolor=#fefefe
| 539895 ||  || — || November 18, 2008 || Kitt Peak || Spacewatch ||  || align=right data-sort-value="0.85" | 850 m || 
|-id=896 bgcolor=#E9E9E9
| 539896 ||  || — || March 25, 2003 || Kitt Peak || Spacewatch ||  || align=right | 2.8 km || 
|-id=897 bgcolor=#E9E9E9
| 539897 ||  || — || October 30, 2010 || Kitt Peak || Spacewatch ||  || align=right data-sort-value="0.94" | 940 m || 
|-id=898 bgcolor=#fefefe
| 539898 ||  || — || July 7, 2014 || Haleakala || Pan-STARRS ||  || align=right data-sort-value="0.75" | 750 m || 
|-id=899 bgcolor=#fefefe
| 539899 ||  || — || October 13, 2015 || Haleakala || Pan-STARRS || H || align=right data-sort-value="0.58" | 580 m || 
|-id=900 bgcolor=#fefefe
| 539900 ||  || — || July 5, 2011 || Haleakala || Pan-STARRS ||  || align=right data-sort-value="0.78" | 780 m || 
|}

539901–540000 

|-bgcolor=#fefefe
| 539901 ||  || — || November 5, 2010 || Mount Lemmon || Mount Lemmon Survey || H || align=right data-sort-value="0.63" | 630 m || 
|-id=902 bgcolor=#fefefe
| 539902 ||  || — || May 21, 2014 || Haleakala || Pan-STARRS ||  || align=right | 1.4 km || 
|-id=903 bgcolor=#fefefe
| 539903 ||  || — || September 14, 2007 || Kitt Peak || Spacewatch || H || align=right data-sort-value="0.65" | 650 m || 
|-id=904 bgcolor=#fefefe
| 539904 ||  || — || October 21, 2003 || Anderson Mesa || LONEOS ||  || align=right data-sort-value="0.91" | 910 m || 
|-id=905 bgcolor=#E9E9E9
| 539905 ||  || — || November 14, 2006 || Mount Lemmon || Mount Lemmon Survey || EUN || align=right | 1.3 km || 
|-id=906 bgcolor=#E9E9E9
| 539906 ||  || — || July 27, 2014 || Haleakala || Pan-STARRS || MAR || align=right | 1.1 km || 
|-id=907 bgcolor=#fefefe
| 539907 ||  || — || March 31, 2014 || Catalina || CSS || H || align=right data-sort-value="0.65" | 650 m || 
|-id=908 bgcolor=#fefefe
| 539908 ||  || — || March 14, 2007 || Kitt Peak || Spacewatch ||  || align=right data-sort-value="0.79" | 790 m || 
|-id=909 bgcolor=#fefefe
| 539909 ||  || — || September 22, 2011 || Kitt Peak || Spacewatch ||  || align=right data-sort-value="0.73" | 730 m || 
|-id=910 bgcolor=#fefefe
| 539910 ||  || — || August 22, 2004 || Kitt Peak || Spacewatch ||  || align=right data-sort-value="0.66" | 660 m || 
|-id=911 bgcolor=#fefefe
| 539911 ||  || — || July 30, 2008 || Kitt Peak || Spacewatch ||  || align=right data-sort-value="0.61" | 610 m || 
|-id=912 bgcolor=#fefefe
| 539912 ||  || — || September 29, 2008 || Mount Lemmon || Mount Lemmon Survey || V || align=right data-sort-value="0.57" | 570 m || 
|-id=913 bgcolor=#fefefe
| 539913 ||  || — || September 15, 2007 || Kitt Peak || Spacewatch ||  || align=right | 1.6 km || 
|-id=914 bgcolor=#fefefe
| 539914 ||  || — || March 19, 2017 || Mount Lemmon || Mount Lemmon Survey || H || align=right data-sort-value="0.60" | 600 m || 
|-id=915 bgcolor=#FA8072
| 539915 ||  || — || December 5, 2008 || Catalina || CSS || H || align=right data-sort-value="0.60" | 600 m || 
|-id=916 bgcolor=#fefefe
| 539916 ||  || — || November 9, 2013 || Mount Lemmon || Mount Lemmon Survey || H || align=right data-sort-value="0.52" | 520 m || 
|-id=917 bgcolor=#fefefe
| 539917 ||  || — || October 7, 2010 || Catalina || CSS || H || align=right data-sort-value="0.65" | 650 m || 
|-id=918 bgcolor=#FA8072
| 539918 ||  || — || March 11, 2011 || Mount Lemmon || Mount Lemmon Survey ||  || align=right data-sort-value="0.77" | 770 m || 
|-id=919 bgcolor=#fefefe
| 539919 ||  || — || December 22, 2005 || Socorro || LINEAR || H || align=right data-sort-value="0.75" | 750 m || 
|-id=920 bgcolor=#d6d6d6
| 539920 ||  || — || February 11, 2002 || Kitt Peak || Spacewatch ||  || align=right | 2.6 km || 
|-id=921 bgcolor=#fefefe
| 539921 ||  || — || March 14, 2007 || Mount Lemmon || Mount Lemmon Survey ||  || align=right data-sort-value="0.86" | 860 m || 
|-id=922 bgcolor=#fefefe
| 539922 ||  || — || November 8, 2007 || Mount Lemmon || Mount Lemmon Survey || H || align=right data-sort-value="0.82" | 820 m || 
|-id=923 bgcolor=#E9E9E9
| 539923 ||  || — || September 4, 2014 || Haleakala || Pan-STARRS ||  || align=right | 1.2 km || 
|-id=924 bgcolor=#fefefe
| 539924 ||  || — || September 22, 2008 || Catalina || CSS ||  || align=right data-sort-value="0.89" | 890 m || 
|-id=925 bgcolor=#fefefe
| 539925 ||  || — || May 14, 2009 || Kitt Peak || Spacewatch || H || align=right data-sort-value="0.56" | 560 m || 
|-id=926 bgcolor=#FA8072
| 539926 ||  || — || September 28, 2013 || Mount Lemmon || Mount Lemmon Survey || H || align=right data-sort-value="0.57" | 570 m || 
|-id=927 bgcolor=#fefefe
| 539927 ||  || — || January 4, 2014 || Mount Lemmon || Mount Lemmon Survey || H || align=right data-sort-value="0.57" | 570 m || 
|-id=928 bgcolor=#fefefe
| 539928 ||  || — || August 30, 2015 || Haleakala || Pan-STARRS || H || align=right data-sort-value="0.72" | 720 m || 
|-id=929 bgcolor=#fefefe
| 539929 ||  || — || December 21, 2008 || Kitt Peak || Spacewatch ||  || align=right | 1.9 km || 
|-id=930 bgcolor=#fefefe
| 539930 ||  || — || July 1, 2005 || Kitt Peak || Spacewatch || H || align=right data-sort-value="0.54" | 540 m || 
|-id=931 bgcolor=#fefefe
| 539931 ||  || — || December 4, 2015 || Haleakala || Pan-STARRS || H || align=right data-sort-value="0.79" | 790 m || 
|-id=932 bgcolor=#fefefe
| 539932 ||  || — || November 26, 2012 || Mount Lemmon || Mount Lemmon Survey ||  || align=right | 1.4 km || 
|-id=933 bgcolor=#E9E9E9
| 539933 ||  || — || October 29, 2010 || Mount Lemmon || Mount Lemmon Survey ||  || align=right | 1.7 km || 
|-id=934 bgcolor=#d6d6d6
| 539934 ||  || — || May 2, 2006 || Mount Lemmon || Mount Lemmon Survey ||  || align=right | 3.7 km || 
|-id=935 bgcolor=#E9E9E9
| 539935 ||  || — || November 16, 2014 || Haleakala || Pan-STARRS ||  || align=right | 1.8 km || 
|-id=936 bgcolor=#E9E9E9
| 539936 ||  || — || October 22, 2014 || Mount Lemmon || Mount Lemmon Survey ||  || align=right data-sort-value="0.90" | 900 m || 
|-id=937 bgcolor=#fefefe
| 539937 ||  || — || November 7, 2007 || Catalina || CSS || H || align=right data-sort-value="0.60" | 600 m || 
|-id=938 bgcolor=#FA8072
| 539938 ||  || — || April 14, 2007 || Mount Lemmon || Mount Lemmon Survey || H || align=right data-sort-value="0.49" | 490 m || 
|-id=939 bgcolor=#fefefe
| 539939 ||  || — || November 11, 2004 || Catalina || CSS || H || align=right data-sort-value="0.90" | 900 m || 
|-id=940 bgcolor=#FFC2E0
| 539940 ||  || — || October 22, 2012 || Haleakala || Pan-STARRS || AMO +1kmmoon || align=right data-sort-value="0.92" | 920 m || 
|-id=941 bgcolor=#fefefe
| 539941 ||  || — || December 9, 2010 || Socorro || LINEAR || H || align=right data-sort-value="0.81" | 810 m || 
|-id=942 bgcolor=#fefefe
| 539942 ||  || — || July 23, 2015 || Haleakala || Pan-STARRS || H || align=right data-sort-value="0.49" | 490 m || 
|-id=943 bgcolor=#E9E9E9
| 539943 ||  || — || March 27, 2003 || Kitt Peak || Spacewatch ||  || align=right | 1.9 km || 
|-id=944 bgcolor=#fefefe
| 539944 ||  || — || January 23, 2014 || Kitt Peak || Spacewatch || H || align=right data-sort-value="0.67" | 670 m || 
|-id=945 bgcolor=#fefefe
| 539945 ||  || — || October 8, 2015 || Haleakala || Pan-STARRS || H || align=right data-sort-value="0.62" | 620 m || 
|-id=946 bgcolor=#FA8072
| 539946 ||  || — || March 18, 2004 || Socorro || LINEAR ||  || align=right data-sort-value="0.50" | 500 m || 
|-id=947 bgcolor=#E9E9E9
| 539947 ||  || — || November 16, 2006 || Kitt Peak || Spacewatch ||  || align=right | 1.6 km || 
|-id=948 bgcolor=#fefefe
| 539948 ||  || — || April 8, 2010 || WISE || WISE ||  || align=right data-sort-value="0.62" | 620 m || 
|-id=949 bgcolor=#fefefe
| 539949 ||  || — || December 4, 2015 || Haleakala || Pan-STARRS ||  || align=right data-sort-value="0.85" | 850 m || 
|-id=950 bgcolor=#d6d6d6
| 539950 ||  || — || October 3, 2013 || Haleakala || Pan-STARRS ||  || align=right | 3.1 km || 
|-id=951 bgcolor=#E9E9E9
| 539951 ||  || — || April 11, 2013 || Kitt Peak || Spacewatch ||  || align=right | 1.1 km || 
|-id=952 bgcolor=#E9E9E9
| 539952 ||  || — || February 2, 2008 || Kitt Peak || Spacewatch ||  || align=right | 1.4 km || 
|-id=953 bgcolor=#fefefe
| 539953 ||  || — || September 1, 2014 || Catalina || CSS ||  || align=right | 1.1 km || 
|-id=954 bgcolor=#E9E9E9
| 539954 ||  || — || June 23, 2009 || Mount Lemmon || Mount Lemmon Survey ||  || align=right | 1.9 km || 
|-id=955 bgcolor=#E9E9E9
| 539955 ||  || — || March 19, 2009 || Kitt Peak || Spacewatch ||  || align=right data-sort-value="0.94" | 940 m || 
|-id=956 bgcolor=#fefefe
| 539956 ||  || — || October 5, 2004 || Kitt Peak || Spacewatch ||  || align=right data-sort-value="0.85" | 850 m || 
|-id=957 bgcolor=#fefefe
| 539957 ||  || — || October 27, 2005 || Kitt Peak || Spacewatch ||  || align=right data-sort-value="0.75" | 750 m || 
|-id=958 bgcolor=#E9E9E9
| 539958 ||  || — || April 27, 2000 || Kitt Peak || Spacewatch ||  || align=right | 1.2 km || 
|-id=959 bgcolor=#E9E9E9
| 539959 ||  || — || July 28, 2009 || Catalina || CSS ||  || align=right | 2.0 km || 
|-id=960 bgcolor=#E9E9E9
| 539960 ||  || — || April 5, 2000 || Socorro || LINEAR ||  || align=right | 1.1 km || 
|-id=961 bgcolor=#E9E9E9
| 539961 ||  || — || September 18, 2014 || Haleakala || Pan-STARRS ||  || align=right data-sort-value="0.95" | 950 m || 
|-id=962 bgcolor=#fefefe
| 539962 ||  || — || February 1, 2006 || Kitt Peak || Spacewatch ||  || align=right data-sort-value="0.89" | 890 m || 
|-id=963 bgcolor=#d6d6d6
| 539963 ||  || — || March 2, 2011 || Catalina || CSS ||  || align=right | 3.4 km || 
|-id=964 bgcolor=#fefefe
| 539964 ||  || — || February 27, 2009 || Mount Lemmon || Mount Lemmon Survey ||  || align=right data-sort-value="0.75" | 750 m || 
|-id=965 bgcolor=#d6d6d6
| 539965 ||  || — || April 30, 2006 || Kitt Peak || Spacewatch ||  || align=right | 3.2 km || 
|-id=966 bgcolor=#E9E9E9
| 539966 ||  || — || June 18, 2013 || Haleakala || Pan-STARRS ||  || align=right | 1.6 km || 
|-id=967 bgcolor=#E9E9E9
| 539967 ||  || — || April 7, 2013 || Kitt Peak || Spacewatch ||  || align=right | 1.1 km || 
|-id=968 bgcolor=#fefefe
| 539968 ||  || — || March 1, 2008 || Mount Lemmon || Mount Lemmon Survey ||  || align=right data-sort-value="0.80" | 800 m || 
|-id=969 bgcolor=#E9E9E9
| 539969 ||  || — || May 15, 2013 || Haleakala || Pan-STARRS ||  || align=right data-sort-value="0.89" | 890 m || 
|-id=970 bgcolor=#fefefe
| 539970 ||  || — || March 23, 2006 || Catalina || CSS ||  || align=right | 1.0 km || 
|-id=971 bgcolor=#fefefe
| 539971 ||  || — || November 18, 2008 || Catalina || CSS ||  || align=right data-sort-value="0.79" | 790 m || 
|-id=972 bgcolor=#fefefe
| 539972 ||  || — || August 22, 2015 || Catalina || CSS || H || align=right data-sort-value="0.61" | 610 m || 
|-id=973 bgcolor=#fefefe
| 539973 ||  || — || November 14, 2010 || Mount Lemmon || Mount Lemmon Survey || H || align=right data-sort-value="0.77" | 770 m || 
|-id=974 bgcolor=#fefefe
| 539974 ||  || — || May 26, 2006 || Kitt Peak || Spacewatch || H || align=right data-sort-value="0.75" | 750 m || 
|-id=975 bgcolor=#fefefe
| 539975 ||  || — || May 10, 2012 || Haleakala || Pan-STARRS || H || align=right data-sort-value="0.54" | 540 m || 
|-id=976 bgcolor=#fefefe
| 539976 ||  || — || September 15, 2007 || Mount Lemmon || Mount Lemmon Survey || H || align=right data-sort-value="0.79" | 790 m || 
|-id=977 bgcolor=#fefefe
| 539977 ||  || — || February 21, 2014 || Haleakala || Pan-STARRS || H || align=right data-sort-value="0.86" | 860 m || 
|-id=978 bgcolor=#fefefe
| 539978 ||  || — || August 12, 2007 || Siding Spring || SSS || H || align=right data-sort-value="0.73" | 730 m || 
|-id=979 bgcolor=#E9E9E9
| 539979 ||  || — || August 20, 2009 || Siding Spring || SSS ||  || align=right | 2.1 km || 
|-id=980 bgcolor=#fefefe
| 539980 ||  || — || December 2, 2015 || Haleakala || Pan-STARRS || H || align=right data-sort-value="0.64" | 640 m || 
|-id=981 bgcolor=#fefefe
| 539981 ||  || — || August 4, 2011 || Siding Spring || SSS ||  || align=right data-sort-value="0.77" | 770 m || 
|-id=982 bgcolor=#fefefe
| 539982 ||  || — || December 10, 2010 || Mount Lemmon || Mount Lemmon Survey || H || align=right data-sort-value="0.70" | 700 m || 
|-id=983 bgcolor=#E9E9E9
| 539983 ||  || — || September 9, 1993 || Kitt Peak || Spacewatch ||  || align=right data-sort-value="0.94" | 940 m || 
|-id=984 bgcolor=#E9E9E9
| 539984 ||  || — || October 22, 2014 || Kitt Peak || Spacewatch ||  || align=right | 1.3 km || 
|-id=985 bgcolor=#E9E9E9
| 539985 ||  || — || January 28, 2011 || Mount Lemmon || Mount Lemmon Survey ||  || align=right | 1.9 km || 
|-id=986 bgcolor=#fefefe
| 539986 ||  || — || March 23, 2014 || Mount Lemmon || Mount Lemmon Survey || H || align=right data-sort-value="0.62" | 620 m || 
|-id=987 bgcolor=#fefefe
| 539987 ||  || — || March 24, 2003 || Kitt Peak || Spacewatch ||  || align=right | 1.0 km || 
|-id=988 bgcolor=#fefefe
| 539988 ||  || — || October 31, 2010 || Mount Lemmon || Mount Lemmon Survey || H || align=right data-sort-value="0.58" | 580 m || 
|-id=989 bgcolor=#E9E9E9
| 539989 ||  || — || April 7, 2008 || Mount Lemmon || Mount Lemmon Survey ||  || align=right | 1.6 km || 
|-id=990 bgcolor=#E9E9E9
| 539990 ||  || — || December 14, 2010 || Mount Lemmon || Mount Lemmon Survey ||  || align=right | 1.4 km || 
|-id=991 bgcolor=#fefefe
| 539991 ||  || — || March 10, 2003 || Kitt Peak || Spacewatch || H || align=right data-sort-value="0.73" | 730 m || 
|-id=992 bgcolor=#fefefe
| 539992 ||  || — || October 3, 2015 || Haleakala || Pan-STARRS || H || align=right data-sort-value="0.71" | 710 m || 
|-id=993 bgcolor=#fefefe
| 539993 ||  || — || March 13, 2014 || Haleakala || Pan-STARRS || H || align=right data-sort-value="0.74" | 740 m || 
|-id=994 bgcolor=#fefefe
| 539994 ||  || — || March 31, 2009 || Mount Lemmon || Mount Lemmon Survey || H || align=right data-sort-value="0.75" | 750 m || 
|-id=995 bgcolor=#fefefe
| 539995 ||  || — || October 2, 2015 || Haleakala || Pan-STARRS || H || align=right data-sort-value="0.64" | 640 m || 
|-id=996 bgcolor=#fefefe
| 539996 ||  || — || July 7, 2014 || Haleakala || Pan-STARRS ||  || align=right data-sort-value="0.68" | 680 m || 
|-id=997 bgcolor=#d6d6d6
| 539997 ||  || — || October 26, 2008 || Mount Lemmon || Mount Lemmon Survey ||  || align=right | 2.4 km || 
|-id=998 bgcolor=#fefefe
| 539998 ||  || — || October 8, 2008 || Mount Lemmon || Mount Lemmon Survey ||  || align=right data-sort-value="0.64" | 640 m || 
|-id=999 bgcolor=#fefefe
| 539999 ||  || — || August 31, 2014 || Kitt Peak || Spacewatch ||  || align=right data-sort-value="0.62" | 620 m || 
|-id=000 bgcolor=#d6d6d6
| 540000 ||  || — || April 26, 2006 || Mount Lemmon || Mount Lemmon Survey ||  || align=right | 3.8 km || 
|}

References

External links 
 Discovery Circumstances: Numbered Minor Planets (535001)–(540000) (IAU Minor Planet Center)

0539